The following list of Lichens of Maryland is derived from the following sources: 
(1) lichens listed in the 1977 publication by Skorepa (Allen C. Skorepa), Norden , and Windler.
(2) lichens listed in the 1979 publication by Skorepa, Norden, and Windler.
(3) lichens listed in the 2002 publication by Biechele as occurring on Maryland's Delmarva Peninsula.
(4) lichens in Elmer Worthley's personal herbarium.
(5) lichens found in Maryland by Edward Uebel.
(6) lichens reported on Maryland's Delmarva Peninsula by Lendemer and Knapp (2007) at six locations: 1. Millington State Wildlife Management Area (1. Millington); 2. Idylwild State Wildlife Management Area (2. Idylwild); 3. Chesapeake State Forest (3. Chesapeake); 4. Sharptown Dunes (4. Sharptown); 5. Hickory Point Cypress Swamp (5. Hickory Pt.); 6. Pocomoke State Forest (6. Pocomoke).

Acarospora fuscata (Schrader) Arnold   [Acarosporaceae]
Skorepa et al. (1979) – on acidic rock.
E.G. Worthley Herbarium - Carroll Co., on stone wall.
E.C. Uebel Herbarium – Lichens of Soldiers Delight.
Acarospora schleicheri (Ach.) A. Massal.   [Acarosporaceae]
Skorepa et al. (1977) – Lichens of Soldiers Delight.
Skorepa et al. (1979) – on acidic rock.
Ahtiana aurescens (Tuck.) Thell & Randlane   [Parmeliaceae]
Syn.: Cetraria aurescens Tuck.
Skorepa et al. (1977) – Allegany Co., on branches of pines.
Skorepa et al. (1979) – on bark.
Allocetraria oakesiana (Tuck.) Randlane & Thell   [Parmeliaceae]
Syn.: Cetraria oakesiana Tuck.
Skorepa et al. (1977) – Frederick Co., base of oak.
Skorepa et al. (1979) – on bark, acidic rock.
E.G. Worthley Herbarium - Garrett Co., along Big Run, on stumps.
Amandinea milliaria (Tuck.) P. May & Sheard   [Physciaceae]
Syn.: Rinodina milliaria Tuck.
Skorepa et al. (1977) – Calvert Co., on trunks of deciduous trees.
Skorepa et al. (1979) – on bark.
Biechele (2002) – lower eastern shore of Maryland.
Amandinea polyspora (Willey) E. Lay & P. May   [Physciaceae]
Syn.: Buellia polyspora (Willey) Vainio
Skorepa et al. (1977) – Carroll Co., bark of deciduous tree.
Skorepa et al. (1979) – on bark.
E.C. Uebel Herbarium – Baltimore Co., Ridge Rd., on bark of Norway Maple.
Amandinea punctata (Hoffm.) Coppins & Scheid.   [Physciaceae]
Syn.: Buellia punctata (Hoffm.) Massal.
Skorepa et al. (1977) – Worcester Co., on oak twigs.
Skorepa et al. (1979) – on bark.
Lendemer & Knapp (2007) - (2. Idylwild)
Anaptychia palmulata (Michaux) Vainio   [Physciaceae]
Skorepa et al. (1977) – Calvert Co., trunks of deciduous trees.
Skorepa et al. (1979) – on bark.
Biechele (2002) – lower eastern shore of Maryland.
E.G. Worthley Herbarium - Baltimore Co.; Calvert Co.; Frederick Co.
Anisomeridium polypori (Ellis & Everh.) M.E. Barr   [Monoblastiaceae]
Lendemer & Knapp (2007) - (4. Sharptown)
Anzia americana Yoshim. & Sharp   [Parmeliaceae]
Lendemer & Knapp (2007) - (6. Pocomoke)
Anzia colpodes (Ach.) Stizenb.   [Parmeliaceae]
Skorepa et al. (1979) – on bark.
Lendemer & Knapp (2007) - (6. Pocomoke)
Arctoparmelia centrifuga? (L.) Hale   [Parmeliaceae]
E.G. Worthley Herbarium - Baltimore Co., Owings Mills.
Arthonia caesia (Flotow) Körber   [Arthoniaceae]
Skorepa et al. (1977) – Baltimore Co., trunk of oak.
Skorepa et al. (1979) – on bark.
E.C. Uebel Herbarium – Baltimore Co., Liberty Reservoir, on bark; Ridge Road, on bark.
Lendemer & Knapp (2007) (1. Millington)
Arthonia rubella (Fée) Nyl.   [Arthoniaceae]
Lendemer & Knapp (2007) - (5. Hickory Pt.), (6. Pocomoke)
Arthopyrenia cinereopruinosa (Schaerer) A. Massal.   [Arthopyreniaceae]
Syn.: Arthopyrenia pinicola (Hepp) Mass.
Skorepa et al. (1977) – Montgomery Co., trunk of elm.
Skorepa et al. (1979) – on bark.
Arthothelium interveniens (Nyl.) Zahlbr.   [Arthoniales]
Lendemer & Knapp (2007) - (6. Pocomoke)
Aspicilia caesiocinerea (Nyl. ex Malbr.) Arnold    [Hymeneliaceae]
Syn.: Lecanora caesiocinerea Nyl.
Skorepa et al. (1977) – Allegany Co., on shale outcrop.
Skorepa et al. (1979) – on acidic rock.
E.G. Worthley Herbarium - Lichens of Soldiers Delight; Montgomery Co., Great Falls.
E.C. Uebel Herbarium – Baltimore Co., Liberty Reservoir, on acidic rock.
Aspicilia cinerea (L.)  Körber   [Hymeneliaceae]
Syn.: Lecanora cinerea (L.) Somm.
Skorepa et al. (1977) – Baltimore Co., on rock ledges.
Skorepa et al. (1979) – on acidic rock.
E.G. Worthley Herbarium - Frederick Co., Cunningham Falls.
Bacidia laurocerasi (Delise ex Duby) Zahlbr. subsp. laurocerasi   [Bacidiaceae]
Syn.: Bacidia atrogrisea (Delilse ex Hepp) Körber
Skorepa et al. (1979) – on bark.
Bacidia polychroa (Th. Fr.) Körber   [Bacidiaceae]
Syn.: Bacidia fuscorubella (Hoffm.) Bausch.
Skorepa et al. (1977) – Baltimore Co., on trunks of deciduous trees.
Skorepa et al. (1979) – on bark.
Bacidia schweinitzii (Fr. ex E. Michener) A. Schneider    [Bacidiaceae]
Skorepa et al.. (1977) – Montgomery Co., on oak.
Skorepa et al. (1979) – on bark.
Biechele (2002) – lower eastern shore of Maryland.
E.G. Worthley Herbarium – Lichens of Soldiers Delight; Anne Arundel Co., Baltimore Co., Wicomico Co.
Lendemer & Knapp (2007) - (2. Idylwild), (4. Sharptown), (5. Hickory Pt.), (6. Pocomoke)
Bacidia trachona (Ach.) Lettau   [Bacidiaceae]
Skorepa et al. (1979) – on calcareous rock.
Bacidina egenula (Nyl.) Vězda   [Bacidiaceae]
Lendemer & Knapp (2007) - (5. Hickory Pt.)
Bacidina inundata (Fr.) Vezda   [Bacidiaceae]
Skorepa et al. (1979) – on bark.
Baculifera curtisii (Tuck.) Marbach   [Physciaceae]
Syn.: Buellia curtisii (Tuck.) Imsh.
Skorepa et al.. (1977) – Calvert Co., trunk of deciduous tree.
Skorepa et al. (1979) – on bark.
Bathelium carolinianum (Tuck.) R.C. Harris   [Trypetheliaceae]
Lendemer & Knapp (2007) - (6. Pocomoke)
Biatora vernalis (L.) Fr.   [Bacidiaceae]
Syn.: Lecidea vernalis (L.) Ach.
Skorepa et al. (1977) – Frederick Co., on trunks of oaks.
Skorepa et al. (1979) – on bark.
Brigantiaea leucoxantha (Spreng.) R. Sant. & Haffel.   [Brigantiaeaceae]
Biechele (2002) – lower eastern shore of Maryland.
Lendemer & Knapp (2007) - (5. Hickory Pt.), (6. Pocomoke)
Bryoria furcellata (Fr.) Brodo & D. Hawksw.   [Parmeliaceae]
Syn.: Alectoria nidulifera Norrl.
Skorepa et al. (1977) – Garrett Co., on pine trunks.
Skorepa et al. (1979) – on bark, acid rock.
E.G. Worthley Herbarium - Wicomico Co.
Buellia badia (Fr.) Massal.   [Physciaceae]
Syn.: Buellia turgescens Tuck.
E.G. Worthley Herbarium - Baltimore Co., St. Thomas Cemetery.
Buellia curtisii (Tuck.) Imshaug   [Physciaceae]
Lendemer & Knapp (2007) (1. Millington), (3. Chesapeake)
Buellia spuria (Schaerer) Anzi   [Physciaceae]
Skorepa et al. (1977) – Montgomery Co. (collection by Fink)
Skorepa et al. (1979) – on acidic rock.
E.G. Worthley Herbarium – Lichens of Soldiers Delight.
Buellia stigmaea Tuck.   [Physciaceae]
Skorepa et al. (1977) – Baltimore Co., (collected by Plitt)
Skorepa et al. (1979) – on acidic rock.
Buellia stillingiana J. Steiner   [Physciaceae]
Skorepa et al. (1977) – Calvert Co., on trunks of deciduous trees.
Skorepa et al. (1979) – on bark.
Biechele (2002) – lower eastern shore of Maryland.
E.G. Worthley Herbarium - Worcester Co.
Lendemer & Knapp (2007) - (4. Sharptown)
Buellia vernicoma Tuck.   [Physciaceae]
Lendemer & Knapp (2007) - (6. Pocomoke)
Byssoloma leucoblepharum Vainio   [Pilocarpaceae]
Lendemer & Knapp (2007) - (5. Hickory Pt.), (6. Pocomoke)
Byssoloma meadii (Tuck.) S. Ekman   [Pilocarpaceae]
Lendemer & Knapp (2007) - (5. Hickory Pt.), (6. Pocomoke)
Calicium salicinum Pers.   [Caliciaceae]
Lendemer & Knapp (2007) - (6. Pocomoke)
Caloplaca camptidia (Tuck.) Zahlbr.   [Teloschistaceae]
Skorepa et al. (1977) – Montgomery Co., oak woods.
Skorepa et al. (1979) – on bark.
Caloplaca cerina (Ehrh. ex Hedwig) Th. Fr.   [Teloschistaceae]
Skorepa et al. (1977) – Garrett Co., on aspen trunks.
Skorepa et al. (1979) – on bark.
Caloplaca citrina (Hoffm.) Th. Fr.   [Teloschistaceae]
Skorepa et al. (1977) – Baltimore Co., on concrete bridge.
Skorepa et al. (1979) – on cement.
Biechele (2002) – lower eastern shore of Maryland.
E.G. Worthley Herbarium – Lichens of Soldiers Delight; Baltimore Co., on wall of stone and cement.
Caloplaca feracissima H. Magn.   [Teloschistaceae]
Skorepa et al. (1977) – Frederick Co., on concrete.
Skorepa et al. (1979) – on cement.
E.G. Worthley Herbarium – Lichens of Soldiers Delight.
E.C. Uebel Herbarium – Prince George's Co., on hill of concrete.
Caloplaca flavorubescens (Hudson) J. R. Laundon   [Teloschistaceae]
Syn.: Caloplaca aurantiaca (Lightf.) Th. Fr.
Skorepa et al. (1977) – Allegany Co., on cement.
Skorepa et al. (1979) – on cement.
E.G. Worthley Herbarium - Baltimore Co., Owings Mills.
Caloplaca flavovirescens (Wulfen) Dalla Torre & Sarnth.
Skorepa et al. (1977) – Washington Co., on limestone.
Skorepa et al. (1979) – on calcareous rock, cement.
Caloplaca holocarpa (Hoffm. ex Ach.) M. Wade   [Teloschistaceae]
Skorepa et al. (1977) – Frederick Co., on timbers.
Skorepa et al. (1979) – on bark, calcareous rock, wood.
Caloplaca lobulata (Flörke) de Lesd.   [Teloschistaceae]
Skorepa et al. (1977) – Cecil Co., on serpentine rock.
Skorepa et al. (1979) – acidic rock.
E.G. Worthley Herbarium – Lichens of Soldiers Delight; Baltimore Co., on bricks.
Caloplaca microphyllina (Tuck.) Hasse   [Teloschistaceae]
Skorepa et al. (1979) – wood.
Caloplaca oxfordensis Fink   [Teloschistaceae]
Skorepa et al. (1977) – Washington Co., on limestone.
Skorepa et al. (1979) – on acidic rock.
Caloplaca sideritis (Tuck.) Zahlbr.   [Teloschistaceae]
Skorepa et al. (1977) – Frederick Co., on cement foundation.
Skorepa et al. (1979) – on acidic rock.
E.G. Worthley Herbarium – Lichens of Soldiers Delight.
Caloplaca subsoluta (Nyl.) Zahlbr.   [Teloschistaceae]
Syn.: Caloplaca modesta (Zahlbr.) Fink
Skorepa et al. (1977) – Montgomery Co. (collected by Fink)
Skorepa et al. (1979) – on acidic rock.
Candelaria concolor (Dickson) B. Stein   [Candelariaceae]
Skorepa et al. (1977) – Allegany Co., on tree trunk.
Skorepa et al. (1979) – on bark.
E.G. Worthley Herbarium – Lichens of Soldiers Delight; Frederick Co.; Carroll Co.
E.C. Uebel Herbarium – Baltimore Co.; Prince George's Co., on bark.
Lendemer & Knapp (2007) - (2. Idylwild)
Candelariella reflexa (Nyl.) Lettau   [Candelariaceae]
Lendemer & Knapp (2007) - (3. Chesapeake)
Candelariella vitellina (Hoffm.) Müll. Arg.   [Candelariaceae]
Skorepa et al. (1977) – Baltimore Co., on rock face.
Skorepa et al. (1979) – on acidic rock.
E.G. Worthley Herbarium – Lichens of Soldiers Delight.
Canoparmelia caroliniana (Nyl.) Elix & Hale   [Parmeliaceae]
Syn.: Parmelia caroliniana Nyl.
Skorepa et al. (1977) – Worcester Co., on tree trunks.
Biechele (2002) – lower eastern shore of Maryland.
Lendemer & Knapp (2007) - (2. Idylwild), (4. Sharptown), (6. Pocomoke)
Canoparmelia crozalsiana (de Lesd. ex Harm.) Elix & Hale    [Parmeliaceae]
Syn.: Parmelia crozalsiana B. de Lesd. ex Harm.
Skorepa et al. (1977) – Frederick Co., on trunk of oak.
Skorepa et al. (1979) – on bark.
E.G. Worthley Herbarium - Talbot Co., on Sycamore.
Lendemer & Knapp (2007) - (2. Idylwild)
Canoparmelia texana (Tuck.) Elix & Hale   [Parmeliaceae]
Syn.: Parmelia texana Tuck.
Skorepa et al. (1977) – Frederick Co., on trunk of maple.
Skorepa et al. (1979) – on bark.
Lendemer & Knapp (2007) - (2. Idylwild)
Catapyrenium cinereum (Pers.) Körber   [Verrucariaceae]
Syn.: Dermatocarpon hepaticum (Ach.) Th. Fr.
Skorepa et al. (1979) – on soil.
E.G. Worthley Herbarium – Lichens of Soldiers Delight.
Catillaria chalybeia (Borrer) A. Massal.   [Catillariaceae]
Skorepa et al. (1977) – Frederick Co., on rocks.
Skorepa et al. (1979) – on acidic rock.
Cetraria arenaria Kärnefelt   [Parmeliaceae]
Syn.: Cetraria islandica (L.) Ach.
Skorepa et al. (1977) – Garrett Co., on soil.
Skorepa et al. (1979) – on soil.
E.G. Worthley Herbarium - Garrett Co., Carey Run.
Cetrelia cetrarioides (Duby) Culb. & C. Culb.   [Parmeliaceae]
E.G. Worthley Herbarium - Baltimore Co., Owings Mills, on oak.
Cetrelia chicitae (W. Culb.) W. Culb. & C. Culb.   [Parmeliaceae]
Skorepa et al. (1977) – Garrett Co., on conglomerate.
Skorepa et al. (1979) – on bark, acidic rock.
E.G. Worthley Herbarium - Frederick Co., Mt. Catoctin Park.
Cetrelia olivetorum (Nyl.) Culb. & C. Culb.   [Parmeliaceae]
Skorepa et al. (1977) – Allegany Co., on trunk of deciduous tree.
Skorepa et al. (1979) – on bark.
Chrismofulvea dialyta (Nyl.) Marbach   [Physciaceae]
Syn.: Buellia dialyta (Nyl.) Tuck.
Skorepa et al. (1979) – on bark.
Chrysothrix candelaris (L.) J. R. Laundon   [Chrysotrichaceae]
Syn.: Lepraria candelaris (L.) Fr.
Skorepa et al. (1979) – on bark.
E.G. Worthley Herbarium - Montgomery Co., on rock outcrop.
E.C. Uebel Herbarium – Baltimore Co., Hollofield, on rock cliff.
Lendemer & Knapp (2007) - (5. Hickory Pt.)
Chrysothrix flavovirens Tønsberg s. lat.   [Chrysotrichaceae]
Lendemer & Knapp (2007) - (5. Hickory Pt.)
Cladonia apodocarpa Robbins   [Cladoniaceae]
Skorepa et al. (1977) – Frederick Co., on soil.
E.G. Worthley Herbarium - Lichens of Soldiers Delight;    Baltimore Co., Gunpowder Falls; Allegany Co.
Cladonia arbuscula (Wallr.) Flotow   [Cladoniaceae]
Skorepa et al. (1977) – Lichens of Soldiers Delight.
E.G. Worthley Herbarium - Lichens of Soldiers Delight; Allegany Co., Green Ridge State Forest; Wicomico Co.
E.C. Uebel Herbarium – Lichens of Soldiers Delight.
Cladonia atlantica A. Evans   [Cladoniaceae]
Skorepa et al. (1977) – Lichens of Soldiers Delight.
Biechele (2002) – lower eastern shore of Maryland.
Cladonia beaumontii (Taylor) Vainio   [Cladoniaceae]
Biechele (2002) – lower eastern shore of Maryland.
Cladonia boryi Tuck.   [Cladoniaceae]
Skorepa et al. (1977) – Lichens of Soldiers Delight.
This is probably a misidentification of Cladonia caroliniana.
Cladonia caespiticia (Pers.) Flörke   [Cladoniaceae]
Skorepa et al. (1977) – Worcester Co., on sandy soil.
Biechele (2002) – lower eastern shore of Maryland.
E.C. Uebel Herbarium – Lichens of Soldiers Delight;  Carroll Co., Liberty Reservoir.
Cladonia cariosa (Ach.) Sprengel   [Cladoniaceae]
E.G. Worthley Herbarium - Lichens of Soldiers Delight.
Cladonia caroliniana Tuck.   [Cladoniaceae]
E.C. Uebel Herbarium – Lichens of Soldiers Delight.
Cladonia cervicornis subsp. verticillata (Hoffm.) Ahti   [Cladoniaceae]
Syn.: Cladonia verticillata (Hoffm.) Schaer.
Skorepa et al. (1977) – Queen Anne's Co., on soil.
Biechele (2002) – lower eastern shore of Maryland.
E.G. Worthley Herbarium - Worcester Co.; Queen Anne's Co.; Baltimore Co.
Cladonia chlorophaea (Flörke ex Sommerf.) Sprengel   [Cladoniaceae]
Skorepa et al. (1977) – Lichens of Soldiers Delight.
Biechele (2002) – lower eastern shore of Maryland.
E.G. Worthley Herbarium - Lichens of Soldiers Delight;  Prince George's Co.; Anne Arundel Co.; Washington Co.
Cladonia coniocraea (Flörke) Sprengel   [Cladoniaceae]
Skorepa et al. (1977) – Garrett Co., on base of pine.
Biechele (2002) – lower eastern shore of Maryland.
E.G. Worthley Herbarium - Baltimore Co.; Calvert Co.
E.C. Uebel Herbarium – Lichens of Soldiers Delight; Baltimore Co., Liberty Reservoir.
Cladonia cristatella Tuck.   [Cladoniaceae]
Skorepa et al. (1977) – Lichens of Soldiers Delight.
Biechele (2002) – lower eastern shore of Maryland.
E.G. Worthley Herbarium - Lichens of Soldiers Delight;  Prince George's Co.; Garrett Co., Swallow Falls.
E.C. Uebel Herbarium – Lichens of Soldiers Delight;  Prince George's Co., Greenbelt.
Cladonia didyma (Fée) Vainio var. didyma   [Cladoniaceae]
Lendemer & Knapp (2007) - (2. Idylwild)
Cladonia fimbriata (L.) Fr.   [Cladoniaceae]
Skorepa et al. (1977) – Garrett Co., on sandstone boulder.
E.G. Worthley Herbarium - Garrett Co.; Allegany Co., Green Ridge State Forest.
Cladonia floerkeana (Fr.) Flörke   [Cladoniaceae]
Skorepa et al. (1977) – Harford Co., on rotting wood.
Cladonia furcata (Hudson) Schrader   [Cladoniaceae]
Skorepa et al. (1977) – Harford Co., on moss.
Cladonia gracilis (L.) Willd. subsp. gracilis   [Cladoniaceae]
Skorepa et al. (1977) – Lichens of Soldiers Delight.
E.G. Worthley Herbarium - Lichens of Soldiers Delight.
Cladonia grayi Merr. ex Sandst.   [Cladoniaceae]
Biechele (2002) – lower eastern shore of Maryland.
E.C. Uebel Herbarium – Lichens of Soldiers Delight.
Lendemer & Knapp (2007) - (2. Idylwild), (3. Chesapeake)
Cladonia incrassata Flörke   [Cladoniaceae]
Skorepa et al. (1977) – Wicomico Co., on sandy soil.
Lendemer & Knapp (2007) - (2. Idylwild), (6. Pocomoke)
Cladonia macilenta Hoffm.   [Cladoniaceae]
Skorepa et al. (1977) – Harford Co., on rotting wood.
E.C. Uebel Herbarium – Carroll Co., Liberty Reservoir; Prince Georges Co., College Park.
Lendemer & Knapp (2007) - (2. Idylwild)
Cladonia macilenta var. bacillaris (Genth) Schaerer   [Cladoniaceae]
Syn.: Cladonia bacillaris (Ach.) Nyl.
Skorepa et al. (1977) – Lichens of Soldiers Delight.
Biechele (2002) – lower eastern shore of Maryland.
E.G. Worthley Herbarium - Prince George's Co.
E.C. Uebel Herbarium – Carroll Co., Liberty Reservoir.
Lendemer & Knapp (2007) - (3. Chesapeake)
Cladonia mateocyatha Robbins   [Cladoniaceae]
Skorepa et al. (1977) – Baltimore Co., on exposed rocks.
Cladonia ochrochlora Flörke   [Cladoniaceae]
Lendemer & Knapp (2007) - (1. Millington)
Cladonia parasitica (Hoffm.) Hoffm.   [Cladoniaceae]
Skorepa et al. (1977) – Worcester Co., on pine stump.
Biechele (2002) – lower eastern shore of Maryland.
Lendemer & Knapp (2007) - (2. Idylwild)
Cladonia peziziformis (With.) J.R. Laundon    [Cladoniaceae]
Syn.: Cladonia capitata (Michx.) Spreng.
Skorepa et al. (1977) – Kent Co., on embankment.
Biechele (2002) – lower eastern shore of Maryland.
E.G. Worthley Herbarium - Lichens of Soldiers Delight.
E.C. Uebel Herbarium – Lichens of Soldiers Delight;  Prince George's Co., Greenbelt.
Cladonia piedmontensis G. Merr.   [Cladoniaceae]
Skorepa et al. (1977) – Wicomico Co., on soil.
E.G. Worthley Herbarium - Baltimore Co.; Wicomico Co.
Cladonia pleurota (Flörke) Schaerer   [Cladoniaceae]
Skorepa et al. (1977) – Lichens of Soldiers Delight.
Biechele (2002) – lower eastern shore of Maryland.
Cladonia polycarpia G. Merr.   [Cladoniaceae]
Lendemer & Knapp (2007) - (3. Chesapeake)
Cladonia polycarpoides Nyl.   [Cladoniaceae]
Biechele (2002) – lower eastern shore of Maryland.
Lendemer & Knapp (2007) - (2. Idylwild)
Cladonia pyxidata (L.) Hoffm.   [Cladoniaceae]
Skorepa et al. (1977) – Allegany Co., on bank of stream.
E.G. Worthley Herbarium - Allegany Co., Green Ridge State Forest; Anne Arundel Co.; Carroll Co.; Washington Co.
Cladonia ramulosa (With.) J.R. Laundon   [Cladoniaceae]
E.G. Worthley Herbarium - Worcester Co., Milburn Landing.
Lendemer & Knapp (2007) - (2. Idylwild)
Cladonia rangiferina (L.) F.H. Wigg.    [Cladoniaceae]
Skorepa et al. (1977) – Allegany Co., on soil.
E.G. Worthley Herbarium - Calvert Co.; Wicomico Co.
Cladonia rappii A. Evans   [Cladoniaceae]
Syn.: Cladonia calycantha Del. ex Nyl.
Skorepa et al. (1977) – Charles Co., on soil.
Biechele (2002) – lower eastern shore of Maryland.
E.G. Worthley Herbarium - Wicomico Co.
Cladonia ravenelii Tuck.   [Cladoniaceae]
Biechele (2002) – lower eastern shore of Maryland.
Cladonia rei Schaerer   [Cladoniaceae]
Syn.: Cladonia nemoxyna (Ach.) Nyl.
Skorepa et al. (1977) – Garrett Co., on rocky soil.
E.G. Worthley Herbarium - Garrett Co.
E.C. Uebel Herbarium – Lichens of Soldiers Delight.
Cladonia santensis Tuck.   [Cladoniaceae]
Skorepa et al. (1977) – Dorchester Co., on soil.
Biechele (2002) – lower eastern shore of Maryland.
Cladonia squamosa Hoffm.   [Cladoniaceae]
Skorepa et al. (1977) – Frederick Co., on basalt outcrop.
Biechele (2002) – lower eastern shore of Maryland.
E.G. Worthley Herbarium - Lichens of Soldiers Delight; Washington Co.
Lendemer & Knapp (2007) - (6. Pocomoke)
Cladonia stellaris (Opiz) Pouzar & Vezda   [Cladoniaceae]
Syn.: Cladonia alpestris (L.) Rabenh.
Skorepa et al. (1977) – Garrett Co., on soil.
Cladonia strepsilis (Ach.) Grognot    [Cladoniaceae]
Skorepa et al. (1977) – Prince George's Co., on shoulder of road.
E.G. Worthley Herbarium - Prince George's Co.
Cladonia subcariosa Nyl.   [Cladoniaceae]
Syns.: Cladonia clavulifera Vain., C. sobolescens Nyl. ex Vain.
Skorepa et al. (1977) – Worcester Co., on sandy soil.
Skorepa et al. (1977) – Kent Co., on soil.
E.G. Worthley Herbarium - St. Mary's Co.; Wicomico Co.
E.C. Uebel Herbarium – Lichens of Soldiers Delight; Prince George's Co., Greenbelt.
Lendemer & Knapp (2007) - (2. Idylwild)
Cladonia subtenuis (Abbayes) Mattick   [Cladoniaceae]
Skorepa et al. (1977) – Lichens of Soldiers Delight.
Biechele (2002) – lower eastern shore of Maryland.
E.G. Worthley Herbarium - Lichens of Soldiers Delight;  Allegany Co.; Calvert County; St. Mary's Co.
E.C. Uebel Herbarium – Lichens of Soldiers Delight;  Prince George's Co.
Lendemer & Knapp (2007) - (2. Idylwild), (3. Chesapeake), (4. Sharptown)
Cladonia turgida Hoffm.   [Cladoniaceae]
Skorepa et al. (1977) – Wicomico Co., on soil.
Cladonia uncialis (L.) F.H. Wigg.   [Cladoniaceae]
Skorepa et al. (1977) – Lichens of Soldiers Delight.
Biechele (2002) – lower eastern shore of Maryland.
Coccocarpia palmicola (Sprengel) Arv. & D.J. Galloway   [Coccocarpiaceae]
Syn.: Coccocarpia cronia (Tuck.) Vain.
Skorepa et al. (1977) – Montgomery Co., on rock outcrop.
Skorepa et al. (1979) – on bark, acidic rock.
Coenogonium luteum (Dicks.) Kalb & Lücking   [Gyalectaceae]
Lendemer & Knapp (2007) - (6. Pocomoke)
Coenogonium pineti (Ach.) Kalb & Lücking   [Gyalectaceae]
Syn.: Dimerella diluta (Pers.) Trevisan
Skorepa et al. (1979) – on wood, other.
Lendemer & Knapp (2007) - (5. Hickory Pt.)
Collema coccophorum Tuck.   [Collemataceae]
Skorepa et al. (1979) – on acidic rock.
Collema conglomeratum Hoffm.   [Collemataceae]
Skorepa et al. (1979) – on bark.
Collema furfuraceum (Arnold) Du Rietz   [Collemataceae]
Skorepa et al. (1977) – Allegany Co., on trunks of deciduous trees.
Skorepa et al. (1979) – bark, acidic rock.
E.G. Worthley Herbarium - Allegany Co., Terrapin Run, near base of tree trunk.
Collema fuscovirens (With.) J.R. Laundon   [Collemataceae]
Syn.: Collema tuniforme (Ach.) Ach.
Skorepa et al. (1979) – on calcareous rock.
Collema leptaleum Tuck.   [Collemataceae]
Skorepa et al. (1979) – on bark.
Collema subflaccidum Degel.   [Collemataceae]
Skorepa et al. (1979) – acidic rock.
E.G. Worthley Herbarium - Baltimore Co., Gunpowder River, on bark of Tulip Tree.
Collema undulatum Laurer ex Flotow   [Collemataceae]
Skorepa et al. (1979) – on acidic rock.
Cyphelium tigillare (Ach.) Ach.   [Caliciaceae]
Skorepa et al. (1979) – on wood.
Dactylospora inquilina Hafellner   [Dactylosporaceae]
Lendemer & Knapp (2007) - (5. Hickory Pt.) (on Pertusaria paratuberculifera)
Dermatocarpon luridum (With.) J.R. Laundon   [Verrucariaceae]
Syn.: Dermatocarpon fluviatile (G. Web.) Th. Fr.
Skorepa et al. (1977) – Baltimore Co., on rocks.
Skorepa et al. (1979) – on acidic rock.
E.G. Worthley Herbarium - Carroll Co., in stream bed; Frederick Co., on boulder in stream.
E.C. Uebel Herbarium – Baltimore Co., Hollofield, on moist rock.
Dermatocarpon miniatum (L.) W. Mann    [Verrucariaceae]
Skorepa et al. (1977) – Baltimore Co., on rock ledge.
Skorepa et al. (1979) – on acidic rock, calcareous rock.
E.G. Worthley Herbarium - Montgomery Co., Great Falls
Dibaeis baeomyces (L. f.) Rambold & Hertel   [Icmadophilaceae]
Syn.: Baeomyces roseus Pers.
Skorepa et al. (1977) – Harford Co., on rock ledge.
Skorepa et al. (1979) – on soil.
Biechele (2002) – lower eastern shore of Maryland.
E.G. Worthley Herbarium - Lichens of Soldiers Delight;  Howard Co.
Dimelaena oreina (Ach.) Norman   [Physciaceae]
Skorepa et al. (1977) – Allegany Co., on sandstone outcrop.
Skorepa et al. (1979) – on acidic rock.
Diploschistes scruposus (Schreber) Norman   [Thelotremataceae]
Skorepa et al. (1979) – on acidic rock.
Dirinaria frostii (Tuck.) Hale & Culb.   [Physciaceae]
Skorepa et al. (1977) – Allegany Co., on shale outcrops.
Skorepa et al. (1979) – on acidic rock.
Endocarpon petrolepideum (Nyl.) Nyl.   [Verrucariaceae]
E.C. Uebel Herbarium – Prince George's Co., Greenbelt, on hill of concrete (identified by Dr. Othmar Breuss, Vienna, Austria, Mar 2005).
Endocarpon pusillum Hedwig   [Verrucariaceae]
Skorepa et al. (1977) – Washington Co., on chert.
Skorepa et al. (1979) – on calcareous rock, cement.
Ephebe lanata (L.) Vainio   [Lichinaceae]
Skorepa et al. (1979) – on acidic rock.
Fissurina insidiosa Hook. & C. Knight   [Graphidaceae]
Lendemer & Knapp (2007) - (5. Hickory Pt.), (6. Pocomoke)
Flavoparmelia baltimorensis (Gyelnik & Fóriss) Hale   [Parmeliaceae]
Syn.: Parmelia baltimorensis Gyelnik & Fóriss
Skorepa et al. (1977) – Baltimore Co., on rock outcrops.
Skorepa et al. (1979) – on acidic rock.
E.G. Worthley Herbarium - Harford Co., Rocks State Park, on acidic rock.
E.C. Uebel Herbarium – Baltimore Co., Liberty Reservoir, on boulders.
Flavoparmelia caperata (L.) Hale   [Parmeliaceae]
Syn.: Parmelia caperata (L.) Ach.
Skorepa et al. (1977) – Lichens of Soldiers Delight, on rocks.
Skorepa et al. (1979) – on bark, acidic rock.
Biechele (2002) – lower eastern shore of Maryland.
E.G. Worthley Herbarium - Calvert Co.; Frederick Co.; Worcester Co., on bark.
E.C. Uebel Herbarium – Prince George's Co., on fallen tree limbs.
Lendemer & Knapp (2007) - (4. Sharptown)
Flavopunctelia flaventior (Stirton) Hale   [Parmeliaceae]
Syn.: Parmelia flaventior Stirt.
Skorepa et al. (1977) – Garrett Co., on oak.
Skorepa et al. (1979) – on bark.
E.G. Worthley Herbarium - Allegany Co.; Garrett Co., Casselman Bridge State Park.
Flavopunctelia soredica (Nyl.) Hale   [Parmeliaceae]
Syn.: Parmelia ulophyllodes (Vaino) Savicz
Skorepa et al. (1979) – on bark.
E.G. Worthley Herbarium - Baltimore Co., Gunpowder State Park.
E.C. Uebel Herbarium – Baltimore Co., Ridge Rd., on bark of Norway Maple.
Fuscopannaria leucophaea (Vahl) P.M. Jørg.   [Pannariaceae]
Syn.: Parmeliella microphylla (Sw.) Müll. Arg.
Skorepa et al. (1979) – on acidic rock.
Fuscopannaria leucosticta (Tuck.) P.M. Jørg.   [Pannariaceae]
Syn.: Pannaria leucosticta (Tuck.) Tuck. ex Nyl.
Skorepa et al. (1979) – on bark.
Gassicurtia vernicoma (Tuck.) Marbach   [Physciaceae]
Syn.: Buellia vernicoma (Tuck.) Tuck.
Skorepa et al. (1977) – (collected by Plitt)
Skorepa et al. (1979) – on bark.
Graphis scripta (L.) Ach.   [Graphidaceae]
Skorepa et al. (1977) – Montgomery Co., on oak.
Skorepa et al. (1979) – on bark.
E.G. Worthley Herbarium - Baltimore Co., Pretty Boy Reservoir; Wicomico Co.
E.C. Uebel Herbarium – Carroll Co., Liberty Reservoir, on tree bark.
Hafellia disciformis (Fr.) Marbach & H. Mayrhofer   [Physciaceae]
Syn.: Buellia disciformis (Fr.) Mudd
Skorepa et al. (1977) – Anne Arundel Co.
Skorepa et al. (1979) – on bark.
Hertelidea botryosa (Fr.) Printzen & Kantvilas   [Stereocaulaceae]
Syn.: Lecidea botryosa (Fr.) Th. Fr.
Skorepa et al. (1979) – on wood.
Heterodermia albicans (Pers.) Swinscow & Krog   [Physciaceae]
Syn.: Heterodermia domingensis (Ach.) Trev.
Skorepa et al. (1977) – Wicomico Co., on tree trunks.
Skorepa et al. (1979) – on bark.
Heterodermia appalachensis (Kurok.) Culb.   [Physciaceae]
Skorepa et al. (1977) – Baltimore Co., on trunk of oak.
Heterodermia granulifera (Ach.) Culb.   [Physciaceae]
Skorepa et al. (1977) – Montgomery Co., on trunk of Walnut tree.
Skorepa et al. (1979) – on bark.
Heterodermia hypoleuca (Muhl.) Trevisan   [Physciaceae]
Skorepa et al. (1977) – Frederick Co, on oak.
Skorepa et al. (1979) – on bark.
Biechele (2002) – lower eastern shore of Maryland.
Heterodermia obscurata (Nyl.) Trevisan   [Physciaceae]
Skorepa et al. (1977) – Charles Co., on trunks of deciduous trees.
Skorepa et al. (1979) – on bark, acidic rock.
E.G. Worthley Herbarium - Baltimore Co., Gunpowder Falls, on tree trunk.
Lendemer & Knapp (2007) - (2. Idylwild), (4. Sharptown)
Heterodermia speciosa (Wulfen) Trevisan   [Physciaceae]
Syn.: Heterodermia tremulans (Müll. Arg.) W. Culb.
Skorepa et al. (1977) – Washington Co., on trunks of deciduous trees.
Skorepa et al. (1979) – on bark, acidic rock.
E.G. Worthley Herbarium - Baltimore Co., Pretty Boy Dam.
Lendemer & Knapp (2007) - (2. Idylwild), (6. Pocomoke)
Hymenelia epulotica (Ach.) Lutzoni   [Hymeneliaceae]
Syn.: Ionaspis epulotica (Ach.) Blomb. & Forssell
Skorepa et al. (1979) – on acidic rock.
Hyperphyscia adglutinata (Flörke) H. Mayrh.   [Physciaceae]
Syn.: Physciopsis adglutinata (Flörke) M. Choisy
Skorepa et al. (1979) – on bark.
Hyperphyscia syncolla (Tuck. ex Nyl.) Kalb   [Physciaceae]
Syns.: Physcia syncolla Tuck. ex Nyl., Physciopsis syncolla (Tuck. ex Nyl.) Poelt
Skorepa et al. (1977) – Wicomico Co., on oak trees.
Skorepa et al. (1979) – on bark.
Biechele (2002) – lower eastern shore of Maryland.
Hypocenomyce scalaris (Ach.) M. Choisy   [Lecideaceae]
Syn.: Lecidea scalaris (Ach. ex Lilj.) Ach.
Skorepa et al. (1979) – on bark, wood.
E.G. Worthley Herbarium - Lichens of Soldiers Delight, on trunk of pine.
Hypogymnia krogiae Ohlsson   [Parmeliaceae]
Skorepa et al. (1977) – Garrett Co., on conifer bark.
Skorepa et al. (1979) – on bark.
Hypogymnia physodes (L.) Nyl.   [Parmeliaceae]
Skorepa et al. (1977) – Garrett Co., on tree trunks.
Skorepa et al. (1979) – on bark, acidic rock.
E.C. Uebel Herbarium – Baltimore Co., on bark of Norway Maple.
Hypotrachyna livida (Taylor) Hale   [Parmeliaceae]
Syn.: Parmelia livida Taylor
Skorepa et al. (1977) – Sommerset Co., on branches of deciduous trees.
Skorepa et al. (1979) – on bark.
Biechele (2002) – lower eastern shore of Maryland.
E.G. Worthley Herbarium - Wicomico Co.; Worcester Co., Milburn Landing, on branches.
Lendemer & Knapp (2007) - (2. Idylwild), (4. Sharptown), (6. Pocomoke)
Hypotrachyna osseoalba (Vainio) Park & Hale   [Parmeliaceae]
Syn.: Parmelia formosana Zahlbr.
Skorepa et al. (1977) – Dorchester Co., on oak trunk.
Skorepa et al. (1979) – on bark.
Lendemer & Knapp (2007) - (4. Sharptown)
Imshaugia aleurites (Ach.) S.F. Meyer   [Parmeliaceae]
Syn.: Parmeliopsis aleurites (Ach.) Nyl.
Skorepa et al. (1977) – Garrett Co., on oak trunk.
Skorepa et al. (1979) – on bark, acidic rock, wood.
E.G. Worthley Herbarium - Lichens of Soldiers Delight, on Virginia pines.
E.C. Uebel Herbarium – Lichens of Soldiers Delight, on trunks of pines.
Imshaugia placorodia (Ach.) S.F. Meyer   [Parmeliaceae]
Syn.: Parmeliopsis placorodia (Ach.) Nyl.
Skorepa et al. (1977) – Harford Co., on pine trees.
Skorepa et al. (1979) – on bark.
E.G. Worthley Herbarium - Lichens of Soldiers Delight, on pine branches.
E.C. Uebel Herbarium – Lichens of Soldiers Delight, on branches of Virginia pines.
Julella fallaciosa (Arnold) R.C. Harris   (Not lichenized.)   [Thelenellaceae]
E.C. Uebel Herbarium – Baltimore Co., Liberty Reservoir, on bark of Tulip Tree.
Lasallia papulosa (Ach.) Llano   [Umbilicariaceae]
Syn.: Umbilicaria papulosa (Ach.) Nyl.
Skorepa et al. (1977) – Baltimore Co., on rocks on hillside.
Skorepa et al. (1979) – on bark, acidic rock.
E.G. Worthley Herbarium - Frederick Co., Cunningham Falls; Montgomery Co., Great Falls.
Lasallia pensylvanica (Hoffm.) Llano   [Umbilicariaceae]
Syn.: Umbilicaria pensylvanica Hoffm.
Skorepa et al. (1977) – Harford Co., on rock outcrops.
Skorepa et al. (1979) – on acidic rock.
E.G. Worthley Herbarium - Washington Co., Wash. Monument State Park, on rocks.
Lasallia pustulata (L.) Mérat   [Umbilicariaceae]
E.G. Worthley Herbarium - Frederick Co., South Mt.; Montgomery Co., Sugarloaf Mt., on boulders.
Lecanora albella (Pers.) Ach. var. albella   [Lecanoraceae]
E.G. Worthley Herbarium - Worcester Co., on bark of Pinus taeda.
Lecanora cadubriae (A. Massal.) Hedl.   [Lecanoraceae]
Skorepa et al. (1979) – on bark.
Lecanora caesiorubella Ach. subsp. caesiorubella    [Lecanoraceae]
Skorepa et al. (1977) – Harford Co., on trunk of oak.
Skorepa et al. (1979) – on bark.
E.G. Worthley Herbarium - Lichens of Soldiers Delight; Wicomico Co.
Lecanora campestris (Schaerer) Hue   [Lecanoraceae]
Skorepa et al. (1977) – Allegany Co., on shale outcrop.
Skorepa et al. (1979) – on acidic rock.
Lecanora chlarotera Nyl.   [Lecanoraceae]
Skorepa et al. (1977) – Calvert Co., on trunks of deciduous trees.
Skorepa et al. (1979) – on bark.
Biechele (2002) – lower eastern shore of Maryland.
Lecanora cinereofusca H. Magn.   [Lecanoraceae]
Lendemer & Knapp (2007) - (2. Idylwild), (5. Hickory Pt.), (6. Pocomoke)
Lecanora dispersa (Pers.) Sommerf.   [Lecanoraceae]
Skorepa et al. (1977) – Washington Co., on stone wall.
Skorepa et al. (1979) – on calcareous rock, cement, other.
E.G. Worthley Herbarium - Baltimore Co.; Washington Co., on rock outcrops.
Lecanora expallens Ach.   [Lecanoraceae]
Syn.: Lecanora conizea (Ach.) Nyl.
Skorepa et al. (1977) – St. Mary's Co., on trunks of Black Locust.
Skorepa et al. (1979) – on bark, wood.
E.G. Worthley Herbarium - Lichens of Soldiers Delight; St. Mary' Co., on trunk of Black Locust.
Lecanora hagenii (Ach.) Ach.   [Lecanoraceae]
Skorepa et al. (1977) – Frederick Co., on old timbers.
Skorepa et al. (1979) – on wood.
Lecanora hybocarpa (Tuck.) Brodo   [Lecanoraceae]
Biechele (2002) – lower eastern shore of Maryland.
Lendemer & Knapp (2007) - (1. Millington), (4. Sharptown), (5. Hickory Pt.), (6. Pocomoke)
Lecanora imshaugii Brodo   [Lecanoraceae]
Biechele (2002) – lower eastern shore of Maryland.
Lecanora minutella Nyl.   [Lecanoraceae]
Lendemer & Knapp (2007) - (2. Idylwild)
Lecanora muralis (Schreber) Rabenh.   [Lecanoraceae]
Skorepa et al. (1977) – Montgomery Co., on rock ledges.
Lecanora muralis var. versicolor (Pers.) Tuck.   [Lecanoraceae]
Syn.: Lecanora versicolor (Pers.) Ach.
Skorepa et al. (1977) – Washington Co., on stone wall.
Skorepa et al. (1979) – on acidic rock.
Skorepa et al. (1979) – on acidic rock, calcareous rock.
E.G. Worthley Herbarium - Washington Co., C & 0 canal, on shale.
Lecanora polytropa (Hoffm.) Rabenh.   [Lecanoraceae]
Skorepa et al. (1979) – on acidic rock.
Lecanora pulicaris (Pers.) Ach.   [Lecanoraceae]
Syn.: Lecanora coilocarpa (Ach.) Nyl.
Skorepa et al. (1977) – Calvert Co., on deciduous trees.
Skorepa et al. (1979) – on bark.
E.C. Uebel Herbarium – Baltimore Co., on bark of Norway Maple.
Lecanora strobilina (Spreng.) Kieffer   [Lecanoraceae]
Biechele (2002) – lower eastern shore of Maryland.
E.C. Uebel Herbarium – Baltimore Co., on bark of Norway Maple; Prince George's Co., on bark of pines.
Lendemer & Knapp (2007) - (2. Idylwild)
Lecanora subpallens Zahlbr. -   [Lecanoraceae]
Lendemer & Knapp (2007) - (1. Millington), (2. Idylwild), (4. Sharptown)
Lecanora thysanophora R.C. Harris   [Lecanoraceae]
Thomas E. Wilson, III  (4 Dec 2006) – IMG_9960.JPG, photographed on tree trunk in woodland on eastern side of Baltimore County, MD.
Lendemer & Knapp (2007) - (1. Millington), (5. Hickory Pt.)
Lecanora xylophila Hue   [Lecanoraceae]
Syn.: Lecanora laevis Poelt (N.A. records are L. xylophila)
Skorepa et al. (1977) – Baltimore Co., on wave-washed timbers.
Skorepa et al. (1979) – on wood.
Lecidea cyrtidia Tuck.   [Lecideaceae]
Skorepa et al. (1977) – Washington Co., on rocks.
Skorepa et al. (1979) – on acidic rock.
Lecidea plebeja Nyl.   [Lecideaceae]
Syn.: Lecidea myriocarpoides Nyl.
Skorepa et al. (1979) – on wood.
Lendemer & Knapp (2007) - (2. Idylwild)
Lecidella stigmatea (Ach.) Hertel & Leuckert   [Lecanoraceae]
Syn.: Lecidea stigmatea Ach.
Skorepa et al. (1979) – on acidic rock.
Lepraria caesiella R.C. Harris   [Family Not Determined]
Lendemer & Knapp (2007) - (2. Idylwild), (4. Sharptown)
Lepraria aff. incana (L.) Ach.   [Family Not Determined]
Lendemer & Knapp (2007) - (1. Millington), (2. Idylwild)
Lepraria lobificans Nyl.   [Family Not Determined]
Syn.: Lepraria finkii (B. de Lesd.) R.C. Harris
E.G. Worthley Herbarium - Baltimore Co., Gunpowder River Area, on Quercus alba.
E.C. Uebel Herbarium – Carroll Co., Liberty Reservoir, rock near water.
Lendemer & Knapp (2007) - (2. Idylwild), (3. Chesapeake)
Lepraria membranacea (Dickson) Vainio   [Family Not Determined]
Syn.: Leproloma membranaceum (Dickson) Vainio
E.G. Worthley Herbarium - Frederick Co., Cunningham Falls.
Lepraria neglecta (Nyl.) Erichsen   [Family Not Determined]
Syn.: Lepraria zonata Brodo = L.caesioalba or L. neglecta.
Skorepa et al. (1977) – Baltimore Co., on acid rocks.
Skorepa et al. (1979) – on bark, acidic rock.
E.G. Worthley Herbarium - Frederick Co., Cunningham Falls; Montgomery Co., Great Falls.
Leptogium azureum (Sw.) Mont.   [Collemataceae]
Skorepa et al. (1977) – Montgomery Co., Plummers Is. (collected by Fink).
Skorepa et al. (1979) – on acidic rock.
Leptogium cyanescens (Rabenh.) Körber   [Collemataceae]
Skorepa et al. (1977) – Worcester Co., on trunks of deciduous trees.
Skorepa et al. (1979) – on bark, acidic rock.
Biechele (2002) – lower eastern shore of Maryland.
E.G. Worthley Herbarium - Baltimore Co., Gunpowder River, on vertical rocks; Frederick Co., Cunningham Falls.
Lendemer & Knapp (2007) - (5. Hickory Pt.), (6. Pocomoke)
Leptogium lichenoides (L.) Zahlbr.   [Collemataceae]
Skorepa et al. (1977) – Allegany Co., on bark of deciduous trees.
Skorepa et al. (1979) – on bark, acidic rock.
Leptogium phyllocarpum (Pers.) Mont.   [Collemataceae]
Biechele (2002) – lower eastern shore of Maryland.
Leptogium subtile (Schrader) Torss.   [Collemataceae]
Syn.: Leptogium minutissimum (Flörke) Fr.
Skorepa et al. (1977) – Montgomery Co., on rock ledge.
Skorepa et al. (1979) – on acidic rock.
Lichenoconium erodens M.S. Christ. & D. Hawksw.   [Anamorphic Ascomycetes]
Lendemer & Knapp (2007) - (5. Hickory Pt.)  (on Lecanora cinereofusca)
Lichenodiplis lecanorae (Vouaux) Dyko & D. Hawksw.   [Anamorphic Ascomycetes]
E.C. Uebel Herbarium – Baltimore Co., Liberty Reservoir, a specimen of Pertusaria xanthodes U-243, was collected growing on a small dead oak branch.   This crustose lichen contained a lichenicolous fungus and a sample of this fungus was sent to the Farlow Herbarium where it was forwarded to Dr. David Hawksworth, who identified it as Lichenodiplis lecanorae.
Lobaria pulmonaria (L.) Hoffm.   [Lobariaceae]
Skorepa et al. (1979) – on bark.
Biechele (2002) – lower eastern shore of Maryland.
E.G. Worthley Herbarium - Frederick Co., Cunningham Falls.
Lobaria quercizans Michaux   [Lobariaceae]
Skorepa et al. (1977) – Garrett Co., on trunk of deciduous tree.
Skorepa et al. (1979) – on bark.
Biechele (2002) – lower eastern shore of Maryland.
E.G. Worthley Herbarium - Frederick Co., Cunningham Falls.
Lendemer & Knapp (2007) - (5. Hickory Pt.)
Loxospora pustulata (Brodo & Culb.) R.C. Harris   [Loxosporaceae]
Lendemer & Knapp (2007) - (2. Idylwild), (4. Sharptown)
Melanelia culbersonii (Hale) Thell   [Parmeliaceae]
Syn.: Cetraria culbersonii Hale
Skorepa et al. (1977) – Allegany Co., on exposed rock.
Skorepa et al. (1979) – on acidic rock.
E.G. Worthley Herbarium - Allegany Co., Dans Rock Overlook.
Melanelixia subaurifera (Nyl.) O. Blanco et al.   [Parmeliaceae]
Syns.: Parmelia subaurifera Nyl., Melanelia subaurifera (Nyl.) Essl.
Skorepa et al. (1977) – Allegany Co., on deciduous trees.
Skorepa et al. (1979) – on bark.
E.C. Uebel Herbarium – Baltimore Co., on bark of Norway Maple.
Melanohalea exasperata (De Not.) O. Blanco et al..   [Parmeliaceae]
Syns.: Parmelia exasperata De Not., Melanelia exasperata (De Not.) Essl.
Skorepa et al. (1979) – on bark.
E.G. Worthley Herbarium - Baltimore Co., Owings Mills.
Metamelanea melambola (Tuck.) Henssen   [Lichinaceae]
Syn.Pyrenopsis melambola (Tuck.) Tuck.
Skorepa et al. (1979) – on calcareous rock.
Micarea erratica (Körber) Hertel, Rambold & Pietschmann   [Micareaceae]
Syn.: Lecidea erratica Körber
Skorepa et al. (1977) – Baltimore Co., on pebbles.
Skorepa et al. (1979) – on acidic rock.
E.G. Worthley Herbarium - Garrett Co., Carey Run, in open field.
Lendemer & Knapp (2007) - (2. Idylwild)
Minutoexcipula mariana V. Atienza* (on Pertusaria)   [Family Not Determined]
Lendemer & Knapp (2007) - (4. Sharptown)
Mycobilimbia berengeriana (A. Massal.) Hafellner & V. Wirth   [Porpidiaceae]
Syn.: Lecidea berengeriana (Massal.) Nyl.
Skorepa et al. (1977) – Frederick Co., on oak trunks.
Skorepa et al. (1979) – on bark.
E.G. Worthley Herbarium - Montgomery Co., Great Falls, on old wood.
Myelochroa aurulenta (Tuck.) Elix & Hale   [Parmeliaceae]
Syns: Parmelia aurulenta Tuck.
Skorepa et al. (1977) – Baltimore Co., on rocks.
Skorepa et al. (1979) – on bark, acidic rock.
E.G. Worthley Herbarium - Baltimore Co., along Gunpowder River, on rock outcrops.
E.C. Uebel Herbarium – Baltimore County, Liberty Reservoir; Prince George's Co., on bark.
Lendemer & Knapp (2007) - (5. Hickory Pt.), (6. Pocomoke)
Myelochroa galbina (Ach.) Elix & Hale   [Parmeliaceae]
Syn.: Parmelia galbina Ach.
Skorepa et al. (1977) – Allegany Co., on trunks of deciduous trees.
Skorepa et al. (1979) – on bark.
E.G. Worthley Herbarium - Allegany Co., along Terrapin Run, on trunks of deciduous trees.
E.C. Uebel Herbarium – Lichens of Soldiers Delight.
Myelochroa metarevoluta (Asah.) Elix & Hale   [Parmeliaceae]
Syn.: Parmelia metarevoluta (Asahina) Hale
Skorepa et al. (1977) – Montgomery Co., on oak trunk.
Skorepa et al. (1979) – on bark.
Myelochroa obsessa (Ach.) Elix & Hale   [Parmeliaceae]
Syn.: Parmelia obsessa Ach.
Skorepa et al. (1977) – Baltimore Co., on acid rocks.
Skorepa et al. (1979) – on bark, acidic rock.
E.G. Worthley Herbarium - Baltimore Co., near Little Gunpowder River, on rock ledges.
Nadvornikia sorediata R.C. Harris   [Thelotremataceae]
Lendemer & Knapp (2007) - (1. Millington), (5. Hickory Pt.), (6. Pocomoke)
Nephroma helveticum Ach. subsp. helveticum    [Nephromataceae]
Skorepa et al. (1977) – Montgomery Co., Plummers Is. (collected by Fink).
Skorepa et al. (1979) – on acidic rock.
Normandina pulchella (Borrer) Nyl.   [Verrucariaceae]
Skorepa et al. (1979) – on bark.
Ochrolechia androgyna (Hoffm.) Arnold   [Pertusariaceae]
Skorepa et al. (1977) – Anne Arundel Co.
Skorepa et al. (1979) – on acidic rock.
Ochrolechia cinera Chev.   [Pertusariaceae]
Biechele (2002) – lower eastern shore of Maryland.
Ochrolechia pseudopallescens Brodo   [Pertusariaceae]
Lendemer & Knapp (2007) - (5. Hickory Pt.)
Ochrolechia trochophora var. trochophora (Vainio) Oshio   [Pertusariaceae]
Syn.: Ochrolechia rosella (Müll. Arg.) Vers.
Biechele (2002) – lower eastern shore of Maryland.
Ochrolechia yasudae Vainio   [Pertusariaceae]
Skorepa et al. (1977) – Frederick Co. (collected by Plitt).
Skorepa et al. (1979) – on acidic rock.
Opegrapha varia Pers.   [Roccellaceae]
Lendemer & Knapp (2007) - (6. Pocomoke)
Opegrapha viridis Pers.   [Roccellaceae]
Lendemer & Knapp (2007) - (5. Hickory Pt.)
Opegrapha vulgata Ach.   [Roccellaceae]
Lendemer & Knapp (2007) - (2. Idylwild), (3. Chesapeake), (4. Sharptown)
Pannaria conoplea (Ach.) Bory   [Pannariaceae]
Syn.: Pannaria pityrea auct.
Skorepa et al. (1979) – on bark.
Pannaria lurida (Mont.) Nyl.   [Pannariaceae]
Skorepa et al. (1979) – on bark.
Biechele (2002) – lower eastern shore of Maryland.
Parmelia saxatilis (L.) Ach.   [Parmeliaceae]
Skorepa et al. (1977) – Frederick Co., in mature oak woods.
Skorepa et al. (1979) – on bark, acidic rock.
E.G. Worthley Herbarium - Baltimore Co., along Gunpowder River, on bark of Quercus velutina.
Parmelia squarrosa Hale   [Parmeliaceae]
Skorepa et al. (1977) – Garrett Co., on Acer.
Skorepa et al. (1979) – on bark.
Lendemer & Knapp (2007) - (6. Pocomoke)
Parmelia sulcata Taylor   [Parmeliaceae]
Skorepa et al. (1977) – Washington Co., on deciduous trees.
Skorepa et al. (1979) – on bark, acidic rock.
E.G. Worthley Herbarium - Lichens of Soldiers Delight; Carroll Co., on bark of Fraxinus americana.
E.C. Uebel Herbarium – Baltimore Co., on bark of Norway Maple.
Parmelinopsis horrescens (Taylor) Elix & Hale   [Parmeliaceae]
Syn.: Parmelia horrescens Taylor
Skorepa et al. (1977) – Calvert Co., on trunks of pines.
Skorepa et al. (1979) – on bark.
E.G. Worthley Herbarium - Worcester Co., Milburn Landing, on bark of Pinus taeda.
Lendemer & Knapp (2007) - (2. Idylwild), (4. Sharptown), (6. Pocomoke)
Parmelinopsis minarum (Vainio) Elix & Hale   [Parmeliaceae]
Syn.: Parmelia dissecta Nyl.
Skorepa et al. (1977) – Frederick Co., on oak trunk.
Skorepa et al. (1979) – on bark, acidic rock.
E.G. Worthley Herbarium - Lichens of Soldiers Delight.
Lendemer & Knapp (2007) - (2. Idylwild), (5. Hickory Pt.)
Parmeliopsis ambigua (Wulfen) Nyl.   [Parmeliaceae]
Skorepa et al. (1977) – Garrett Co., on trunk of deciduous tree.
Skorepa et al. (1979) – on bark.
E.G. Worthley Herbarium - Worcester Co., Milburn Landing, on bark of Pinus taeda.
Parmeliopsis hyperopta (Ach.) Arnold   [Parmeliaceae]
Syn.: Parmeliopsis diffusa (Weber) Riddle
E.G. Worthley Herbarium - Baltimore Co., Owings Mills.
Parmeliopsis subambigua Gyelnik   [Parmeliaceae]
Syn.: Parmeliopsis halei (Tuck.) Hale
Skorepa et al. (1977) – Worcester Co., on pine trunks.
Skorepa et al. (1979) – on bark.
Lendemer & Knapp (2007) - (4. Sharptown), (6. Pocomoke)
Parmotrema cetratum (Ach.) Hale   [Parmeliaceae]
Syns.: Parmelia cetrata Ach, Rimelia cetrata (Ach.) Hale & Fletcher
Skorepa et al. (1977) – Worcester Co., on trunk of Sweet gum.
Skorepa et al. (1979) – on bark.
Parmotrema chinense (Osbeck) Hale & Ahti   [Parmeliaceae]
Syn.: Parmotrema perlatum (Huds.) Choisy
E.C. Uebel Herbarium – Baltimore Co., on bark of Norway Maple, on oak limb.
Parmotrema crinitum (Ach.) M. Choisy   [Parmeliaceae]
Syn.: Parmelia crinita Ach.
Skorepa et al. (1977) – Worcester Co., on trunk of pine.
Skorepa et al. (1979) – on bark.
E.G. Worthley Herbarium - Baltimore Co., Owings Mills, on trees.
Parmotrema dilatatum (Vainio) Hale   [Parmeliaceae]
Syn.: Parmelia dilatata Vainio
Skorepa et al. (1977) – Dorchester Co., on trunks of deciduous trees.
Skorepa et al. (1979) – on bark.
Parmotrema eurysacum (Hue) Hale   [Parmeliaceae]
Syn.: Parmelia eurysaca Hue
Skorepa et al. (1977) – Baltimore Co. (collected by Plitt).
Skorepa et al. (1979) – on bark.
Parmotrema gardneri (Dodge) Serux.   [Parmeliaceae]
Biechele (2002) – lower eastern shore of Maryland.
Parmotrema hypoleucinum (B. Stein) Hale   [Parmeliaceae]
Biechele (2002) – lower eastern shore of Maryland.
Parmotrema hypoleucinum (J. Steiner) Hale   [Parmeliaceae]
Lendemer & Knapp (2007) - (4. Sharptown), (6. Pocomoke)
Parmotrema hypotropum (Nyl.) Hale   [Parmeliaceae]
Syn.: Parmelia hypotropa Nyl.
Skorepa et al. (1977) – Kent Co., on trees.
Skorepa et al. (1979) – on bark.
Biechele (2002) – lower eastern shore of Maryland.
E.G. Worthley Herbarium - Kent Co., on trees; Somerset Co., on deciduous trees; Wicomico Co.; Worcester Co., on bark of Pinus taeda.
E.C. Uebel Herbarium – Baltimore Co.; Prince George's Co., on bark and boulder.
Lendemer & Knapp (2007) - (1. Millington), (2. Idylwild), (4. Sharptown), (6. Pocomoke)
Parmotrema margaritatum (Hue) Hale   [Parmeliaceae]
Syn.: Parmelia margaritata Hue
Skorepa et al. (1979) – on bark.
Parmotrema perforatum (Jacq.) A. Massal.   [Parmeliaceae]
Syn.: Parmelia perforata (Jacq.) Ach.
Skorepa et al. (1977) – Charles Co., on deciduous trees.
Skorepa et al. (1979) – on bark.
Biechele (2002) – lower eastern shore of Maryland.
E.G. Worthley Herbarium - Prince George's Co., on bark of oak; Worcester Co., Milburn Landing.
Lendemer & Knapp (2007) - (5. Hickory Pt.)
Parmotrema reticulatum (Taylor) M. Choisy   [Parmeliaceae]
Syns.: Parmelia reticulata Taylor, Rimelia reticulata (Taylor) Hale & Fletcher
Skorepa et al. (1977) – Charles Co., on deciduous trees.
Skorepa et al. (1979) – on bark.
Biechele (2002) – lower eastern shore of Maryland.
E.G. Worthley Herbarium - Lichens of Soldiers Delight;  Worcester Co., on bark of Taxodium and Acer rubrum.
E.C. Uebel Herbarium – Lichens of Soldiers Delight.
Parmotrema stuppeum (Taylor) Hale   [Parmeliaceae]
Syn.: Parmelia stuppea Taylor
Skorepa et al. (1977) – Garrett Co., on trunk of oak.
Skorepa et al. (1979) – on bark.
E.C. Uebel Herbarium – Baltimore Co., on bark of Norway Maple.
Parmotrema subisidiosum (Müll. Arg.) Hale
Biechele (2002) – lower eastern shore of Maryland.
Lendemer & Knapp (2007) - (2. Idylwild), (5. Hickory Pt.), (6. Pocomoke)
Parmotrema submarginale (Michx.) DePriest & Hale   [Parmeliaceae]
Syn.: Parmelia michauxiana Zahlbr.
Skorepa et al. (1977) – Charles Co., on deciduous trees.
Skorepa et al. (1979) – on bark.
E.G. Worthley Herbarium - Calvert Co., Battle Creek Cypress Swamp, on bark; Worcester Co., Milburn Landing, on deciduous trees.
Lendemer & Knapp (2007) - (4. Sharptown), (5. Hickory Pt.), (6. Pocomoke)
Parmotrema subtinctorium (Zahlbr.) Hale   [Parmeliaceae]
Syn.: Parmelia subcrinita Nyl.
Skorepa et al. (1977) – Somerset Co., on deciduous trees.
Skorepa et al. (1979) – on bark.
Parmotrema xanthinum (Müll. Arg.) Hale   [Parmeliaceae]
Syn.: Parmelia xanthina (Müll. Arg.) Vainio
Skorepa et al. (1979) – on bark.
Biechele (2002) – lower eastern shore of Maryland.
Lendemer & Knapp (2007) - (6. Pocomoke)
Peltigera aphthosa (L.) Willd.   [Peltigeraceae]
Skorepa et al. (1977) – No County, (Thomson, 1940).
Peltigera canina (L.) Willd.   [Peltigeraceae]
Skorepa et al. (1977) – Garrett Co., with moss on sandstone.
E.G. Worthley Herbarium - Garrett Co., Casselman Bridge State Park, on sandstone rocks; Wicomico Co., on sandy soil.
Peltigera didactyla (With.) J. R. Laundon   [Peltigeraceae]
Syn.: Peltigera spuria (Ach.) DC.
Skorepa et al. (1977) – Washington Co., on rock in seepage area.
Peltigera elisabethae Gyelnik   [Peltigeraceae]
Skorepa et al. (1977) – Baltimore Co., with moss on wet rocks.
Peltigera evansiana Gyelnik   [Peltigeraceae]
Skorepa et al. (1977) – Baltimore Co., (collected by Plitt).
Peltigera horizontalis (Hudson) Baumg.   [Peltigeraceae]
Skorepa et al. (1977) – Baltimore Co., (collected by Merrill 1906).
Peltigera neckeri Müll. Arg.   [Peltigeraceae]
Biechele (2002) – lower eastern shore of Maryland.
Peltigera polydactylon (Necker) Hoffm.   [Peltigeraceae]
Skorepa et al. (1977) – Garrett Co., on moss covered rocks.
Peltigera praetextata (Flörke ex Sommerf.) Zopf   [Peltigeraceae]
Skorepa et al. (1977) – Dorchester Co., at base of tree.
Biechele (2002) – lower eastern shore of Maryland.
Lendemer & Knapp (2007) - (3. Chesapeake)
Peltigera rufescens (Weiss) Humb.   [Peltigeraceae]
Biechele (2002) – lower eastern shore of Maryland.
Peltula euploca (Ach.) Poelt    [Peltulaceae]
Skorepa et al. (1979) – on soil.
Pertusaria amara (Ach.) Nyl.   [Pertusariaceae]
Skorepa et al. (1979) – on bark.
Pertusaria epixantha R.C. Harris   [Pertusariaceae]
Lendemer & Knapp (2007) - (5. Hickory Pt.)
Pertusaria globularis (Ach.) Tuck.   [Pertusariaceae]
Skorepa et al. (1979) – on other.
Pertusaria hypothamnolica Dibben   [Pertusariaceae]
Skorepa et al. (1979) – on bark.
Pertusaria macounii (Lamb) Dibben    [Pertusariaceae]
Skorepa et al. (1979) – on bark.
Pertusaria multipunctoides Dibben   [Pertusariaceae]
Skorepa et al. (1979) – on bark.
Biechele (2002) – lower eastern shore of Maryland.
E.C. Uebel Herbarium – Baltimore Co., Liberty Reservoir, on trunk of Carya.
Lendemer & Knapp (2007) - (5. Hickory Pt.)
Pertusaria ophthalmiza (Nyl.) Nyl.   [Pertusariaceae]
Biechele (2002) – lower eastern shore of Maryland.
Lendemer & Knapp (2007) - (5. Hickory Pt.)
Pertusaria paratuberculifera Dibben   [Pertusariaceae]
Pertusaria tuberculifera Nyl is misidentification for N.A., most specimens are P. paratuberculifera.
Skorepa et al. (1977) – Frederick Co., on oak trunks.
Skorepa et al. (1979) – on bark.
Lendemer & Knapp (2007) - (1. Millington), (2. Idylwild), (5. Hickory Pt.), (6. Pocomoke)
Pertusaria plittiana Erichsen   [Pertusariaceae]
Skorepa et al. (1979) – on acidic rock.
Pertusaria propinqua Müll. Arg.   [Pertusariaceae]
Skorepa et al. (1979) – on bark.
Lendemer & Knapp (2007) - (6. Pocomoke)
Pertusaria pustulata (Ach.) Duby   [Pertusariaceae]
Skorepa et al. (1979) – on bark.
E.C. Uebel Herbarium – Prince George's Co., on dead limb of deciduous tree.
Lendemer & Knapp (2007) - (1. Millington)
Pertusaria rubefacta Erichsen   [Pertusariaceae]
Skorepa et al. (1979) – on bark.
Pertusaria subpertusa Brodo   [Pertusariaceae]
Skorepa et al. (1979) – on bark.
Lendemer & Knapp (2007) - (2. Idylwild), (6. Pocomoke)
Pertusaria tetrathalamia (Fée) Nyl.   [Pertusariaceae]
Skorepa et al. (1979) – on bark.
Pertusaria texana Müll. Arg.   [Pertusariaceae]
Skorepa et al. (1979) – on bark.
Lendemer & Knapp (2007) - (2. Idylwild)
Pertusaria trachythallina Erichsen   [Pertusariaceae]
Skorepa et al. (1979) – on bark.
Pertusaria velata (Turner) Nyl.   [Pertusariaceae]
Skorepa et al. (1977) – Frederick Co., in oak woods.
Skorepa et al. (1979) – on bark.
Lendemer & Knapp (2007) - (2. Idylwild), (5. Hickory Pt.), (6. Pocomoke)
Pertusaria waghornei Hulting   [Pertusariaceae]
Skorepa et al. (1979) – on bark.
Pertusaria xanthodes Müll. Arg.   [Pertusariaceae]
Skorepa et al. (1977) – Harford Co., on tree bark.
Skorepa et al. (1979) – on bark.
E.G. Worthley Herbarium - Calvert Co.; Frederick Co.; Washington Co., on bark of Quercus velutina.
E.C. Uebel Herbarium – Baltimore Co., Liberty Reservoir, on bark of dead oak branch.
Phaeocalicium curtisii (Tuck.) Tibell   [Mycocaliciaceae]
E.G. Worthley Herbarium - Baltimore Co., on twigs of Rhus glabra.
Phaeocalicium polyporaeum (Nyl.) Tibell   [Mycocaliciaceae]
E.C. Uebel Herbarium – a specimen of Violet Toothed Polypore [Trichaptum biforme (Fries) Ryvarden] was collected with Flavoparmelia caperata (U-65) growing on the bark of a fallen oak tree at Liberty Reservoir in Baltimore County.   The T. biforme had a stubble lichen growing on it which was identified by Dr. Steven Selva as Phaeocalicium polyporaeum.
Lendemer & Knapp (2007) - (2. Idylwild), (4. Sharptown), (6. Pocomoke)
Phaeographis inusta (Ach.) Müll. Arg.   [Graphidaceae]
Lendemer & Knapp (2007) - (2. Idylwild), (4. Sharptown)
Phaeophyscia adiastola (Essl.) Essl.   [Physciaceae]
Syns.: Physcia orbicularis (Necker) Poetsch; Phaeophyscia orbicularis (Necker) Moberg
Skorepa et al. (1977) – Allegany Co., on oak trunk.
Skorepa et al. (1979) – on bark, acidic rock, other.
E.G. Worthley Herbarium – Worcester Co., on bark of Taxodium; Frederick Co., Cunningham Falls; Baltimore Co., Church of the Brethren.
Phaeophysica ciliata (Hoffm.) Moberg   [Physciaceae]
Syn.: Physcia ciliata (Hoffm.) Du Rietz
Skorepa et al. (1977) – Caroline Co., on cement bridge.
Skorepa et al. (1979) – on bark.
Phaeophyscia hirsuta (Mereschk.) Essl.   [Physciaceae]
Syns.: Physcia hirsuta Mereschk., Phaeophyscia cernohorskyi (Nádv.) Essl.
Skorepa et al. (1979) – on cement.
Phaeophyscia hirtella Essl.   [Physciaceae]
Skorepa et al. (1979) – on bark.
Phaeophyscia hispidula (Ach.) Essl.   [Physciaceae]
Syn.: Phaeophyscia imbricata Vainio
Skorepa et al. (1979) – on bark.
Phaeophyscia pusilloides (Zahlbr.) Essl.   [Physciaceae]
Syn.: Physcia pusilloides Zahlbr.
Skorepa et al. (1977) – Frederick Co., on trees.
Skorepa et al. (1979) – on bark.
E.C. Uebel Herbarium – Lichens of Soldiers Delight; Baltimore Co., on bark of Norway Maple;
Phaeophyscia rubropulchra (Degel.) Essl.   [Physciaceae]
Syn.: Physcia orbicularis f. rubropulchra Degel.
Skorepa et al. (1977) – Garrett Co., in upland woods.
Skorepa et al. (1979) – on bark, acidic rock, other.
Biechele (2002) – lower eastern shore of Maryland.
E.C. Uebel Herbarium – Lichens of Soldiers Delight; Baltimore Co., Liberty Reservoir, on trunk of Tulip tree.
Lendemer & Knapp (2007) - (1. Millington), (2. Idylwild)
Phlyctis ludoviciensis (Müll. Arg.) Lendemer   [Phlyctidaceae]
Lendemer & Knapp (2007) - (5. Hickory Pt.)
Physcia adscendens (Fr.) H. Olivier   [Physciaceae]
Skorepa et al. (1977) – Allegany Co., on deciduous trees.
Skorepa et al. (1979) – on bark, calcareous rock.
E.G. Worthley Herbarium - Lichens of Soldiers Delight; Baltimore Co., St. Thomas Cemetery, on gravestone.
Physcia aipolia (Ehrh. ex Humb.) Fürnr. var. aipolia     [Physciaceae]
Skorepa et al. (1977) – Worcester Co., on deciduous trees.
Skorepa et al. (1979) – on bark.
Biechele (2002) – lower eastern shore of Maryland.
E.G. Worthley Herbarium - Lichens of Soldiers Delight; Frederick Co., Cunningham Falls.
E.C. Uebel Herbarium – Carroll Co., Liberty Reservoir, on bark; Baltimore Co., on Norway Maple.
Physcia americana G. Merr.   [Physciaceae]
Syn.: Physcia tribacoides Nyl.
Skorepa et al. (1977) – Worcester Co., on deciduous trees.
Skorepa et al. (1979) – on bark, acidic rock, calcareous rock.
E.G. Worthley Herbarium - Baltimore Co., Grace Methodist Church, Gunpowder River, on Tulip Tree; Frederick Co., Cunningham Falls.
Lendemer & Knapp (2007) - (2. Idylwild), (5. Hickory Pt.)
Physcia millegrana Degel.   [Physciaceae]
Skorepa et al. (1977) – Garrett Co., on oak.
Skorepa et al. (1979) – on bark, acidic rock.
Biechele (2002) – lower eastern shore of Maryland.
E.G. Worthley Herbarium - Calvert Co.; Wicomico Co.; Carroll Co., Falls Realty Company, on cement steps.
E.C. Uebel Herbarium – Prince Georges Co., on dead limb; Carroll Co., Liberty Reservoir, on bark.
Lendemer & Knapp (2007) - (2. Idylwild)
Physcia phaea (Tuck.) J.W. Thomson   [Physciaceae]
Skorepa et al. (1977) – Baltimore Co., (collected by Plitt 1909)
Skorepa et al. (1979) – on acidic rock.
Physcia pseudospeciosa J.W. Thomson   [Physciaceae]
Skorepa et al. (1977) – Baltimore Co., on acid rocks.
Skorepa et al. (1979) – on acidic rock.
E.G. Worthley Herbarium - Baltimore Co., near Gunpowder River, on vertical acidic rocks.
Physcia pumilior R.C. Harris   [Physciaceae]
Lendemer & Knapp (2007) - (2. Idylwild)
Physcia stellaris (L.) Nyl.   [Physciaceae]
Skorepa et al. (1977) – Baltimore Co., on oak.
Skorepa et al. (1979) – on bark.
Biechele (2002) – lower eastern shore of Maryland.
E.C. Uebel Herbarium – Baltimore Co., on bark of Norway Maple; Prince George's Co., on bark.
Physcia subtilis Degel.   [Physciaceae]
Skorepa et al. (1977) – Montgomery Co., on rock ledges.
Skorepa et al. (1979) – on acidic rock.
E.G. Worthley Herbarium - Frederick Co., Cunningham Falls.
Physciella chloantha (Ach.) Essl.   [Physciaceae]
Syn.: Physcia luganensis Mereschk.
Skorepa et al. (1977) – Queen Anne's Co., on cement bridge.
Skorepa et al. (1979) – on bark, cement.
E.C. Uebel Herbarium – Prince George's Co., along bike path, on concrete; on tree branch.
Physconia detersa (Nyl.) Poelt   [Physciaceae]
Skorepa et al. (1979) – on bark, calcareous rock, cement.
E.G. Worthley Herbarium - Lichens of Soldiers Delight; Baltimore Co., Green Spring Valley, on brick wall; on old cement bridge.
Placidium arboreum (Schwein. ex Michener) Lendemer   [Verrucariaceae]
Syn.: Dermatocarpon tuckermanii (Rav.) Zahlbr.; Placidium tuckermanii (Ravenel ex Mont.) Breuss
Skorepa et al. (1977) – Allegany Co., base of White Oak.
Skorepa et al. (1979) – on bark.
E.G. Worthley Herbarium - Allegany Co., Green Ridge State Forest, on base of White Oak.
Placidium lachneum (Ach.) Breuss   [Verrucariaceae]
E.G. Worthley Herbarium - Lichens of Soldiers Delight.
Placynthiella uliginosa (Schrader) Coppins & P. James   [Agyriaceae]
Syn.: Lecidea uliginosa (Schrad.) Ach.
Skorepa et al. (1977) – Dorchester Co., on oak trunk.
Skorepa et al. (1979) – on bark.
Biechele (2002) – lower eastern shore of Maryland.
Lendemer & Knapp (2007) - (2. Idylwild)
Placynthium nigrum (Hudson) Gray   [Placynthiaceae]
Skorepa et al. (1977) – Garrett Co., on block of cement.
Skorepa et al. (1979) – on calcareous rock, cement.
E.G. Worthley Herbarium - Baltimore Co., St. Thomas Church Cemetery, on rock wall.
Platismatia tuckermanii (Oakes) Culb. & C. Culb.   [Parmeliaceae]
Skorepa et al. (1977) – Garrett Co., on sandstone boulder.
Skorepa et al. (1979) – on bark, acidic rock, wood
Polysporina simplex (Davies) Vezda   [Acarosporaceae]
Syn.: Sarcogyne simplex (Davies) Nyl.
Skorepa et al. (1979) – on acidic rock.
E.G. Worthley Herbarium - Howard Co., on rock outcrop.
Porina cestrensis (Tuck. ex Michener) Müll. Arg.   [Trichotheliaceae]
Skorepa et al. (1979) – on bark.
Porina heterospora (Fink ex J. Hedrick) R.C. Harris [Trichotheliaceae]
Lendemer & Knapp (2007) - (5. Hickory Pt.), (6. Pocomoke)
Porpidia albocaerulescens (Wulfen) Hertel & Knoph   [Porpidiaceae]
Syn.: Lecanora albocaerulescens (Wulf.) Ach.
Skorepa et al. (1977) – Lichens of Soldiers Delight.
Skorepa et al. (1979) – on acidic rock.
E.G. Worthley Herbarium - Baltimore Co., near small bridge, on Wissahickon schist; Frederick Co.; Garrett Co., on rocks along Big Run.
E.C. Uebel Herbarium – Baltimore Co., Liberty Reservoir, on sandstone boulder.
Porpidia crustulata? (Ach.) Hertel & Knoph   [Porpidiaceae]
E.C. Uebel Herbarium – Lichens of Soldiers Delight.
Porpidia macrocarpa (DC.) Hertel & A. J. Schwab   [Porpidiaceae]
Syn.: Lecidea macrocarpa (DC.) Steud.
Skorepa et al. (1977) – Garrett Co., on sandstone.
Skorepa et al. (1979) – on acidic rock.
Protoblastenia rupestris (Scop.) J. Steiner   [Psoraceae]
Skorepa et al. (1979) – on calcareous rock, cement.
Pseudevernia consocians (Vainio) Hale & Culb.   [Parmeliaceae]
Syn.: Parmelia furfuracea (L.) Ach.
Skorepa et al. (1977) – Garrett Co., on upper branches of Hemlock.
Skorepa et al. (1979) – on bark.
E.G. Worthley Herbarium - Baltimore Co., Owings Mills.
Pseudosagedia cestrensis (Tuck. ex E. Michener) R.C. Harris   [Porinaceae]
Lendemer & Knapp (2007) - (2. Idylwild)
Pseudosagedia raphidosperma (Müll. Arg.) R.C. Harris   [Porinaceae]
Lendemer & Knapp (2007) - (4. Sharptown)
Psora decipiens (Hedwig) Hoffm.   [Psoraceae]
Syn.: Lecidea decipiens (Hedwig) Ach.
Skorepa et al. (1979) – on soil.
Psora russellii (Tuck.) A. Schneider   [Psoraceae]
Syn.: Lecidea russellii Tuck.
Skorepa et al. (1977) – Frederick Co., on conglomerate boulders.
Skorepa et al. (1979) – on calcareous rock.
Psorotichia schaereri (A. Massal.) Arnold   [Lichinaceae]
Skorepa et al. (1979) – on cement.
Psorula rufonigra (Tuck.) Gotth. Schneider   [Psoraceae]
Syn.: Lecidea rufonigra (Tuck.) Nyl.
Skorepa et al. (1977) – Lichens of Soldiers Delight.
Skorepa et al. (1979) – on acidic rock.
Punctelia appalachensis (Culb.) Krog   [Parmeliaceae]
Syn.: Parmelia appalachensis Culb.
Skorepa et al. (1979) – on bark.
Punctelia bolliana (Müll. Arg.) Krog   [Parmeliaceae]
Syn.: Parmelia bolliana Müll. Arg.
Skorepa et al. (1979) – on bark.
Punctelia borreri (Sm.) Krog   [Parmeliaceae]
Syn.: Parmelia borreri (Sm.) Turner
Skorepa et al. (1979) – on bark.
Punctelia missouriensis G. Wilh. & Ladd
Lendemer & Knapp (2007) - (2. Idylwild)
Punctelia perreticulata (Räsänen) G. Wilh. & Ladd   [Parmeliacae]
Syns.: Punctelia subrudecta (Nyl.) Krog, Parmelia subrudecta Nyl.
Skorepa et al. (1977) – Lichens of Soldiers Delight.
Skorepa et al. (1979) – on bark, acidic rock.
Biechele (2002) – lower eastern shore of Maryland.
E.G. Worthley Herbarium - Lichens of Soldiers Delight; Baltimore Co., Owings Mills, on bark.
E.C. Uebel Herbarium – Lichens of Soldiers Delight; Baltimore Co., on bark of Norway Maple.
Lendemer & Knapp (2007) - (4. Sharptown)
Punctelia rudecta (Ach.) Krog   [Parmeliaceae]
Syn.: Parmelia rudecta Ach.
Skorepa et al. (1977) – Caroline Co., on trunks of trees.
Skorepa et al. (1979) – on bark, acidic rock.
Biechele (2002) – lower eastern shore of Maryland.
E.G. Worthley Herbarium - Lichens of Soldiers Delight; Baltimore Co., Ivy Mill Road, on bark; Calvert Co.; Wicomico Co.; Carroll Co., on bark of Tulip Tree.
E.C. Uebel Herbarium – Prince George's Co., on dead limb; Carroll Co., Liberty Reservoir, on bark.
Lendemer & Knapp (2007) - (1. Millington), (5. Hickory Pt.), (6. Pocomoke)
Pycnothelia papillaria Dufour   [Cladoniaceae]
Skorepa et al. (1977) – Prince George's Co., along dirt road.
Skorepa et al. (1979) – on soil.
Biechele (2002) – lower eastern shore of Maryland.
E.C. Uebel Herbarium – Lichens of Soldiers Delight.
Pyrenula pseudobufonia (Rehm) R.C. Harris   [Pyrenulaceae]
Syn.: Pyrenula neglecta R.C. Harris
Skorepa et al. (1979) – on bark.
Lendemer & Knapp (2007) - (2. Idylwild), (5. Hickory Pt.)
Pyrenula punctella Trevis.   [Pyrenulaceae]
Lendemer & Knapp (2007) - (5. Hickory Pt.), (6. Pocomoke)
Pyrenula subelliptica (Tuck.) R.C. Harris   [Pyrenulaceae]
Syn.: Pyrenula imperfecta (Ellis & Everh.) R.C. Harris
Skorepa et al. (1979) – on bark.
Pyrrhospora varians (Ach.) R.C. Harris   [Lecanoraceae]
Syn.: Lecidea varians Ach.
Skorepa et al. (1977) – Worcester Co., on twigs of Myrica.
Skorepa et al. (1979) – on bark.
Lendemer & Knapp (2007) - (2. Idylwild), (5. Hickory Pt.), (6. Pocomoke)
Pyxine caesiopruinosa (Tuck.) Imshaug   [Physciaceae]
Skorepa et al. (1977) – Howard Co., on tree.
Skorepa et al. (1979) – on bark.
E.G. Worthley Herbarium - Baltimore Co., on bark of Juglans nigra; Carroll Co., on bark of Juglans nigra.
Pyxine sorediata (Ach.) Mont.   [Physciaceae]
Skorepa et al. (1977) – Garrett Co., on oak.
Skorepa et al. (1979) – on bark.
Biechele (2002) – lower eastern shore of Maryland.
E.G. Worthley Herbarium – Frederick Co.; Baltimore Co., growing on a sterile crust, Pertusaria?
E.C. Uebel Herbarium – Baltimore Co., Liberty Reservoir, on tree root; Ridge Road, on bark Norway Maple.
Lendemer & Knapp (2007) - (1. Millington), (2. Idylwild), (4. Sharptown)
Pyxine subcinerea Stirton   [Physciaceae]
E.C. Uebel Herbarium – Prince George's Co., on oak bark; Baltimore Co., on maple bark.
Ramalina americana? Hale   [Ramalinaceae]
Biechele (2002) – lower eastern shore of Maryland.
Ramalina fastigiata (Pers.) Ach.   [Ramalinaceae]
Skorepa et al. (1977) – Worcester Co., on branches of deciduous trees.
Skorepa et al. (1979) – on bark.
Ramalina willeyi R. Howe   [Ramalinaceae]
Skorepa et al. (1977) – Worcester Co., on branches of deciduous trees.
Biechele (2002) – lower eastern shore of Maryland.
Ramonia microspora Vězda   [Gyalectaceae]
Lendemer & Knapp (2007) - (2. Idylwild)
Rhizocarpon concentricum (Davies) Beltr.   [Rhizocarpaceae]
E.G. Worthley Herbarium - Garrett Co., Swallow Falls State Forest, on sandstone.
Rhizocarpon eupetraeum (Nyl.) Arnold   [Rhizocarpaceae]
Syn.: Rhizocarpon intermedium Degel.
Skorepa et al. (1979) – on acidic rock.
Rhizocarpon geographicum (L.) DC.   [Rhizocarpaceae]
Skorepa et al. (1979) – on acidic rock.
Rhizocarpon obscuratum (Ach.) A. Massal.   [Rhizocarpaceae]
Skorepa et al. (1977) – Baltimore Co., on rock outcrop.
Skorepa et al. (1979) – on acidic rock.
Rhizoplaca chrysoleuca (Sm.) Zopf   [Lecanoraceae]
Syn.: Lecanora rubina (Vill.) Ach.;  Lecanora chrysoleuca (Sm.) Ach.
Skorepa et al. (1977) – Montgomery Co., on rock ledges.
Skorepa et al. (1979) – on acidic rock.
E.G. Worthley Herbarium - Frederick Co., Mt. Catoctin Park; Montgomery Co., Great Falls, on rocks.
Rimelia subisidiosa (Müll. Arg.) Hale & Fletcher   [Parmeliaceae]
Syn.: Parmelia subisidiosa (Müll. Arg.) C.W. Dodge
Skorepa et al. (1979) – on bark.
Rinodina applanata H. Magn.   [Physciaceae]
Skorepa et al. (1979) – on bark.
Rinodina ascociscana Tuck.   [Physciaceae]
Skorepa et al. (1979) – on bark.
Rinodina exigua (Ach.) Gray   [Physciaceae]
Skorepa et al. (1979) – on bark.
Rinodina ochrocea Willey ex Fink   [Physciaceae]
Skorepa et al. (1979) – on acidic rock.
Rinodina oxydata (A. Massal.) A. Massal.   [Physciaceae]
Skorepa et al. (1979) – on acidic rock.
Rinodina papillata H. Magn.   [Physciaceae]
Skorepa et al. (1979) – on bark.
Rinodina subminutaH. Magn.   [Physciaceae]
Skorepa et al. (1979) – on bark.
Sarcogyne clavus (DC.) Kremp.   [Acarosporaceae]
Skorepa et al. (1979) – on acidic rock.
Sarcogyne regularis Körber   [Acarosporaceae]
Skorepa et al. (1979) – on calcareous rock.
E.C. Uebel Herbarium – Prince George's Co., Greenbelt, on hill of concrete.
Sarcosagium campestre (Fr.) Poetsch & Schiedem.   [Acarosporaceae]
Syn.: Biatorella campestris (Fr.) Almq.
Skorepa et al. (1979) – on soil.
Schismatomma glaucescens (Nyl. ex Willey) R.C. Harris   [Roccellaceae]
Lendemer & Knapp (2007) - (4. Sharptown)
Scoliciosporum chlorococcum (Stenh.) Vezda   [Lecanoraceae]
Syn.: Bacidia chlorococca (Graeve ex Stizenb.) Lett.
Skorepa et al. (1977) – Montgomery Co., on oak.
Skorepa et al. (1979) – on bark.
E.G. Worthley Herbarium - Worcester Co., Milburn Landing.
E.C. Uebel Herbarium – Baltimore Co., Liberty Reservoir, on bark of Acer rubrum.
Lendemer & Knapp (2007) - (2. Idylwild)
Scoliciosporum umbrinum (Ach.) Arnold   [Lecanoraceae]
Syn.: Bacidia umbrina (Ach.) Bausch
Skorepa et al. (1977) – Garrett Co., on aspens.
Skorepa et al. (1979) – on acid rock.
Sphinctrina turbinata (Pers ex Fr.) de Not.   [Sphinctrinaceae]
E.C. Uebel Herbarium – Carroll Co., Liberty Reservoir, on Aspicilia caesiocinerea.
Sticta fuliginosa (Hoffm.) Ach.   [Lobariaceae]
E.G. Worthley Herbarium - Frederick Co., along Appalachian Trail, on soil.
Teloschistes chrysophthalmus (L.) Th. Fr.   [Teloschistaceae]
Skorepa et al. (1979) – on bark.
Tephromela atra (Huds.) Hafellner   [Bacidiaceae]
Lendemer & Knapp (2007) - (6. Pocomoke)
Thelidium minutulum Körber   [Verrucariaceae]
Lendemer & Knapp (2007) - (5. Hickory Pt.)
Thelotrema monospermum R.C. Harris   [Thelotremataceae]
Lendemer & Knapp (2007) - (6. Pocomoke)
Thelotrema subtile Tuck.   [Thelotremataceae]
Lendemer & Knapp (2007) - (5. Hickory Pt.), (6. Pocomoke)
Trapelia coarctata (Sm.) M. Choisy   [Agyriaceae]
Syn.: Lecidea coarctata (Sm.) Nyl.
Skorepa et al. (1979) – on acidic rock.
Trapeliopsis flexuosa (Fr.) Coppins & P. James   [Agyriaceae]
Syn.: Lecidea aeruginosa Borrer
Skorepa et al. (1977) – Harford Co., on fence post.
Skorepa et al. (1979) – on wood.
E.C. Uebel Herbarium – Prince George's Co., NE Branch of Anacostia River Bike Trail, on weathered fence rail.
Lendemer & Knapp (2007) - (2. Idylwild), (3. Chesapeake)
Trapeliopsis granulosa (Hoffm.) Lumbsch   [Agyriaceae]
Syn.: Lecidea granulosa (Hoffm.) Ach.
Skorepa et al. (1979) – on soil.
E.G. Worthley Herbarium - Montgomery Co., Great Falls, on timber.
Trypethelium virens Tuck. ex Michener   [Trypetheliaceae]
Skorepa et al. (1979) – on bark.
E.G. Worthley Herbarium - Calvert Co., on bark.
Lendemer & Knapp (2007) - (4. Sharptown), (5. Hickory Pt.)
Tuckermanella fendleri (Nyl.) Essl.   [Parmeliaceae]
Syn.: Cetraria fendleri (Nyl.) Tuck.; Tuckermannopsis fendleri (Nyl.) Hale
Skorepa et al. (1977) – Lichens of Soldiers Delight.
Skorepa et al. (1979) – on bark.
Biechele (2002) – lower eastern shore of Maryland.
E.G. Worthley Herbarium - Wicomico Co., Wicomico State Park; on Loblolly Pine; Worcester Co., Milburn Landing, on bark of Loblolly Pines.
Tuckermannopsis americana (Sprengel) Hale   [Parmeliaceae]
Lendemer & Knapp (2007) - (4. Sharptown)
Tuckermannopsis ciliaris (Ach.) Gyelnik   [Parmeliaceae]
Syn.: Cetraria ciliaris Ach.
Skorepa et al. (1977) – Lichens of Soldiers Delight.
Skorepa et al. (1979) – on bark.
E.G. Worthley Herbarium - Lichens of Soldiers Delight; Wicomico Co., on bark.
Umbilicaria mammulata (Ach.) Tuck.   [Umbilicariaceae]
Syn.: Gyrophora dillenii (Tuck.) Müll.
Skorepa et al. (1977) – Garrett Co., on conglomerate.
Skorepa et al. (1979) – on bark, acidic rock.
E.G. Worthley Herbarium - Baltimore Co., Loch Raven, on rock outcrop; Frederick Co., South Mt., on boulders; Montgomery Co., Sugarloaf Mt., on boulders.
Umbilicaria muehlenbergii (Ach.) Tuck.   [Umbilicariaceae]
Skorepa et al. (1977) – Allegany Co., on rock outcrop.
Skorepa et al. (1979) – on acidic rock.
Umbilicaria vellea (L.) Hoffm.   [Umbilicariaceae]
Skorepa et al. (1977) – No locality. (collected by Plitt 1912)
Skorepa et al. (1979) – on acidic rock.
Usnea filipendula Stirton   [Parmeliaceae]
Syn.: Usnea dasypoga (Ach.) Rohl.
Skorepa et al. (1977) – Garrett Co., (collected by Smith).
Skorepa et al. (1979) – on bark.
Usnea mutabilis Stirton   [Parmeliaceae]
Skorepa et al. (1977) – Worcester Co., on pines.
Skorepa et al. (1979) – on bark.
Biechele (2002) – lower eastern shore of Maryland.
E.G. Worthley Herbarium - Worcester Co., Pocomoke State Park, on Taxodium distichum.
Usnea pensylvanica Motyka   [Parmeliaceae]
Lendemer & Knapp (2007) - (2. Idylwild), (6. Pocomoke)
Usnea strigosa (Ach.) Eaton   [Parmeliaceae]
Skorepa et al. (1977) – Worcester Co., on deciduous trees.
Biechele (2002) – lower eastern shore of Maryland.
E.G. Worthley Herbarium – Worcester Co.; Calvert Co, Battle Creek Cypress Swamp; St. Mary's Co.; Wicomico Co.
E.C. Uebel Herbarium – Baltimore Co., Ridge Rd., on bark of Norway Maple.
Lendemer & Knapp (2007) - (6. Pocomoke)
Usnea strigosa subsp. rubiginea (Michaux) I. Tav.   [Parmeliaceae]
Syn.: Usnea rubiginea (Michx.) Massal.
Skorepa et al. (1977) – Worcester Co., on deciduous trees.
Skorepa et al. (1979) – on bark.
Usnea subscabrosa Nyl. ex Motyka   [Parmeliaceae]
Lendemer & Knapp (2007) - (2. Idylwild), (4. Sharptown), (5. Hickory Pt.), (6. Pocomoke)
Usnea trichodea Ach.   [Parmeliaceae]
Skorepa et al. (1977) – Worcester Co., on tops of Cypress trees.
Skorepa et al. (1979) – on bark.
Biechele (2002) – lower eastern shore of Maryland.
Lendemer & Knapp (2007) - (6. Pocomoke)
Verrucaria calciseda DC.   [Verrucariaceae]
Skorepa et al. (1979) – on calcareous rock.
Verrucaria fuscella (Turner) Winch   [Verrucariaceae]
Skorepa et al. (1979) – on calcareous rock.
Verrucaria glaucovirens Grummann   [Verrucariaceae]
Syn.: Verrucaria virens Nyl.
Skorepa et al. (1979) – on calcareous rock.
Verrucaria muralis Ach.   [Verrucariaceae]
Skorepa et al. (1979) – on calcareous rock.
Verrucaria nigrescens Pers.   [Verrucariaceae]
Skorepa et al. (1977) – Lichens of Soldiers Delight.
Skorepa et al. (1979) – on calcareous rock.
Verrucaria pinguicula A. Massal.   [Verrucariaceae]
Skorepa et al. (1979) – on calcareous rock.
Xanthomendoza fallax (Hepp) Søchting, Kärnefelt & S. Kondr.   [Teloschistaceae]
Syn.: Xanthoria fallax (Hepp) Arn.
Skorepa et al. (1977) – Worcester Co., on deciduous trees.
Skorepa et al. (1979) – on bark, cement.
Biechele (2002) – lower eastern shore of Maryland.
Xanthomendoza fulva (Hoffm.) Søchting, Kärnefelt & S. Kondr.   [Teloschistaceae]
Syn.: Xanthoria fulva (Hoffm.) Poelt & Petutschnig
E.C. Uebel Herbarium – Baltimore Co., Ridge Rd., on bark of Norway Maple.
Xanthoparmelia angustiphylla (Gyelnik) Hale   [Parmeliaceae]
Syn.: Parmelia hypopsila Müll. Arg. = Xanthoparmelia hypopsila, but N.A. records are Xanthoparmelia angustiphylla.
Skorepa et al. (1977) – Baltimore Co., on rock outcrop.
Skorepa et al. (1979) – on acidic rock.
Xanthoparmelia conspersa (Ehrh. ex Ach.) Hale    [Parmeliaceae]
Syn.: Parmelia conspersa (Ach.) Ach.
Skorepa et al. (1977) – Garrett Co., on rock outcrop.
Skorepa et al. (1979) – on acidic rock.
E.G. Worthley Herbarium - Lichens of Soldiers Delight; Baltimore Co., Gunpowder River, on rock outcrops; Frederick Co.
Xanthoparmelia cumberlandia (Gyelnik) Hale   [Parmeliaceae]
Syn.: Parmelia cumberlandia (Gyelnik) Hale
Skorepa et al. (1977) – Baltimore Co., on rocks on hillside.
Skorepa et al. (1979) – on acidic rock.
Xanthoparmelia plittii (Gyelnk) Hale   [Parmeliaceae]
Syn.: Parmelia plittii Gyelnik
Skorepa et al. (1977) – Washington Co., on rock outcrops.
Skorepa et al. (1979) – on acidic rock.
E.C. Uebel Herbarium – Lichens of Soldiers Delight.
Xanthoparmelia subramigera (Gyelnik) Hale   [Parmeliaceae]
E.C. Uebel Herbarium – Prince George's Co., Berwyn Heights, on roof shingles (identified by Dr. Richard C. Harris).
Xanthoparmelia tasmanica (Hook. f. & Taylor) Hale   [Parmeliaceae]
Syn.: Parmelia tasmanica Hook. f. & Taylor
Skorepa et al. (1979) – on acidic rock.
Xanthoparmelia viriduloumbrina (Gyelnik) Lendemer   [Parmeliaceae]
Syn: Parmelia taractica Kremplh. = Xanthoparmelia taractica (Kremp.) Hale – known from Mexico, but misidentifications for our area; specimens in eastern N.A. are X. viriduloumbrina.
Skorepa et al. (1977) (Parmelia taractica) – Baltimore Co., on serpentine rocks.
Skorepa et al. (1979) (Parmelia taractica) – on acidic rock.
E.G. Worthley Herbarium (Parmelia taractica);  Allegany Co. (Parmelia taractica), Green Ridge State Forest, on red shale; Carroll Co. (Parmelia taractica), Church of the Brethren, on stone wall.
Xanthoria parietina? (L.) Th. Fr.   [Teloschistaceae]
Biechele (2002) – lower eastern shore of Maryland.

References

Biechele, Lance T. 2002. The lichen flora of the lower Eastern Shore of the Delmarva Peninsula. Evansia 19 (1): 17–19.
Lendemer, J. C., and W. M. Knapp. 2007. Contributions to the lichen flora of Maryland: recent collections from the Delmarva Peninsula. Opuscula Philolichenum 4: 23–40. 
Skorepa, A. C., A. W. Norden and D. R. Windler. 1977. Studies on the lichens of Maryland. [Annotated checklist]. Castanea 42 (4): 265–279.
Skorepa, A. C., A. W. Norden and D. R. Windler. 1979. Substrate ecology of lichens in Maryland. Castanea 44 (3): 129–142.

Lists of lichens
Lichens